Re'eh, Reeh, R'eih, or Ree (—Hebrew for "see", the first word in the parashah) is the 47th weekly Torah portion (parashah) in the annual Jewish cycle of Torah reading and the fourth in the Book of Deuteronomy. It comprises . In the parashah, Moses set before the Israelites the choice between blessing and curse. Moses instructed the Israelites in the laws that they were to observe, including the law of a single centralized place of worship. Moses warned against following other gods and their prophets and set forth the laws of kashrut, tithes, the Sabbatical year, the Hebrew slave, firstborn animals, and the three pilgrim festivals.

The parashah is the longest weekly Torah portion in the Book of Deuteronomy (although not in the Torah), and is made up of 7,442 Hebrew letters, 1,932 Hebrew words, 126 verses, and 258 lines in a Torah Scroll (Sefer Torah). Jews generally read it in August or early September. Jews read part of the parashah, which addresses the Three Pilgrim Festivals (Shalosh Regalim), as the initial Torah reading on the eighth day of Passover when it falls on a weekday and on the second day of Shavuot when it falls on a weekday. And Jews read a larger selection from the same part of the parashah, as the initial Torah reading on the eighth day of Passover when it falls on a Sabbath, on the second day of Shavuot when it falls on a Sabbath, and on Shemini Atzeret.

Readings
In the masoretic text of the Tanakh (Hebrew Bible), Parashat Re'eh has six "open portion" (petuchah) divisions (roughly equivalent to paragraphs, often abbreviated with the Hebrew letter  (peh)). Parashat Re'eh has several further subdivisions, called "closed portions" (setumah) (abbreviated with the Hebrew letter  (samekh)) within the open portion divisions. The first open portion spans the first, second and part of the third readings. The second open portion goes from the middle of the third reading to the end of the fourth reading. The third open portion spans the fifth and sixth readings. The fourth, fifth, and sixth open portion divisions divide the seventh reading. Closed portion divisions further divide each of the seven readings.

First reading—Deuteronomy 11:26–12:10
In the first reading, Moses told the Israelites that he set before them blessing and curse: blessing if they obeyed God's commandments and curse if they did not obey but turned away to follow other gods. A closed portion ends here.

In the continuation of the reading, Moses directed that when God brought them into the land, they were to pronounce the blessings at Mount Gerizim and the curses at Mount Ebal. Moses instructed the Israelites in the laws that they were to observe in the land: They were to destroy all the sites at which the residents worshiped their gods. They were not to worship God as the land's residents had worshiped their gods, but to look only to the site that God would choose. There they were to bring their offerings and feast before God, happy in all God's blessings.

Second reading—Deuteronomy 12:11–28
In the second reading, Moses warned the Israelites not to sacrifice burnt offerings in any place, but only in the place that God would choose. But whenever they desired, they could slaughter and eat meat in any of their settlements, so long as they did not consume the blood, which they were to pour on the ground. They were not, however, to consume in their settlements their tithes, firstlings, vow offerings, freewill offerings, or contributions; these they were to consume along with their children, slaves, and local Levites in the place that God would choose.

In the continuation of the reading, Moses made clear that even as God gave the Israelites more land, they could eat meat in their settlements, so long as they did not consume the blood, and so long as they brought their offerings to the place that God would show them.

Third reading—Deuteronomy 12:29–13:19
In the third reading, Moses warned them against being lured into the ways of the residents of the land, and against inquiring about their gods, for the residents performed for their gods every abhorrent act that God detested, even offering up their sons and daughters in fire to their gods. Moses warned the Israelites carefully to observe only that which he enjoined upon them, neither adding to it nor taking away from it. The first open portion ends here.

In the continuation of the reading, Moses instructed that if a prophet (nabhi, נבָיִא) appeared before the Israelites and gave them a sign or a portent and urged them to worship another god, even if the sign or portent came true, they were not to heed the words of that prophet, but put the offender to death. A closed portion ends here.

In a further continuation of the reading, Moses instructed that if a brother, son, daughter, wife, or close friend enticed one in secret to worship other gods, the Israelites were to show no pity, but stone the offender to death. Another closed portion ends here.

And as the reading continues, Moses instructed that if the Israelites heard that some scoundrels had subverted the inhabitants of a town to worship other gods, the Israelites were to investigate thoroughly, and if they found it true, they were to destroy the inhabitants and the cattle of that town - termed an "Ir nidachat" - burning the town and everything in it. They were not to rebuild on the site. The third reading and a closed portion end here with the end of the chapter.

Fourth reading—Deuteronomy 14:1–21
In the fourth reading, Moses prohibited the Israelites from gashing themselves or shaving the front of their heads because of the dead.

In the continuation of the reading, Moses prohibited the Israelites from eating anything abhorrent. Among land animals, they could eat ox, sheep, goat, deer, gazelle, roebuck, wild goat, ibex, antelope, mountain sheep, and any other animal that has true hoofs that are cleft in two and chews cud. But the Israelites were not to eat or touch the carcasses of camel, hare, daman, or swine. A closed portion ends here.

In the next part of the reading, Moses instructed that of animals that live in water, the Israelites could eat anything that has fins and scales, but nothing else. Another closed portion ends here.

As the reading continues, Moses instructed that the Israelites could eat any clean bird, but could not eat eagle, vulture, black vulture, kite, falcon, buzzard, raven, ostrich, nighthawk, sea gull, hawk, owl, pelican, bustard, cormorant, stork, heron, hoopoe, or bat. They could not eat any winged swarming things. They could not eat anything that had died a natural death, but they could give it to a stranger or sell it to a foreigner. They could not boil a kid in its mother's milk. The fourth reading and the second open portion end here.

Fifth reading—Deuteronomy 14:22–29
In the fifth reading, Moses instructed that the Israelites were to set aside every year a tenth part of their harvest. They were to consume the tithes of their new grain, wine, and oil, and the firstlings of their herds and flocks, in the presence of God in the place where God would choose. If the distance to that place was too great, they could convert the tithes or firstlings into money, take the proceeds to the place that God had chosen, and spend the money and feast there. They were not to neglect the Levite in their community, for the Levites had no hereditary portion of land. A closed portion ends here.

In the continuation of the reading, Moses instructed that every third year, the Israelites were to take the full tithe, but leave it within their settlements, and the Levite, the proselyte, the orphan, and the widow in their settlements could come and eat. The fifth reading and a closed portion end here with the end of the chapter.

Sixth reading—Deuteronomy 15:1–18
In the sixth reading, Moses described "the Lord's Release", stating that every seventh year, the Israelites were to remit debts from fellow Israelites, although they could continue to dun foreigners. There would be no needy among them if only they kept all God's laws, for God would bless them. A closed portion ends here.

In the continuation of the reading, Moses instructed that if one of their kinsmen fell into need, the Israelites were not to harden their hearts, but were to open their hands and lend what the kinsman needed. The Israelites were not to harbor the base thought that the year of remission was approaching and not lend, but they were to lend readily to their kinsman, for in return God would bless them in all their efforts.

In the continuation of the reading, Moses instructed that if a fellow Hebrew was sold into servitude, the Hebrew slave would serve six years, and in the seventh year go free. When the master set the slave free, the master was to give the former slave parting gifts. Should the slave tell the master that the slave did not want to leave, the master was to take an awl and put it through the slave's ear into the door, and the slave was to become the master's slave in perpetuity.

Seventh reading—Deuteronomy 15:19–16:17
In the seventh reading, Moses instructed that the Israelites were to consecrate to God all male firstlings born in their herds and flocks and eat them with their household in the place that God would choose. If such an animal had a defect, the Israelites were not to sacrifice it, but eat it in their settlements, as long as they poured out its blood on the ground. The fourth open portion ends here with the chapter.

In the continuation of the reading, Moses instructed the Israelites to observe Passover, Shavuot, and Sukkot. Three times a year, on those three Festivals, all Israelite men were to appear in the place that God would choose, each with his own gift, according to the blessing that God had bestowed upon him. The maftir reading of  concludes the parashah with the discussion of Sukkot, and  concludes the final closed portion.

Readings according to the triennial cycle
Jews who read the Torah according to the triennial cycle of Torah reading read the parashah according to the following schedule:

In inner-biblical interpretation
The parashah has parallels or is discussed in these Biblical sources:

Deuteronomy chapter 12

 

, like , addresses the centralization of sacrifices and the permissibility of eating meat.  prohibited killing an ox, lamb, or goat (each a sacrificial animal) without bringing it to the door of the Tabernacle as an offering to God. , however, allows killing and eating meat in any place.

 commanded the Israelite people to "look only to the site that the Lord your God will choose amidst all your tribes as His habitation, to establish His name there. There you are to go, and there you are to bring your burnt offerings and other sacrifices, . . . your votive and freewill offerings (nidvoteichem)." For you love that sort of thing, O Israelites —declares my Lord God."

Deuteronomy chapter 14

Deuteronomy chapter 15
 affirms that there will always be poor among the people of Israel. While  has been interpreted in some biblical versions as stating to the contrary: "Of course there won’t be any poor persons among you because the Lord will bless you" (e.g. Common English Bible translation), other versions suggest that provision is made for not applying the law of the Lord's Release is made in the event that there be no poverty in the land (King James Version: "Save when there shall be no poor among you") and in other cases a purposive interpretation is adopted: "To the end that there be no poor among you". "Houbigant follows this marginal reading, to which he joins the end of the third verse, considering it as explanatory of the law; as if [Moses] had said, 'Thou shalt not exact the debt that is due from thy brother, but [thy hand shall release] him, for this reason, [that there may be no poor among you] through your severity.' He justly contends that the phrase efes ke, can here only mean "to the end that", being equivalent to the French afin que.

Passover
 refers to the Festival of Passover. In the Hebrew Bible, Passover is called:
"Passover" (Pesach),
"The Feast of Unleavened Bread" (Chag haMatzot), and
"A holy convocation" or "a solemn assembly" (mikrah kodesh).

Some explain the double nomenclature of "Passover" and "Feast of Unleavened Bread" as referring to two separate feasts that the Israelites combined sometime between the Exodus and when the Biblical text became settled.  and  indicate that the dedication of the firstborn also became associated with the festival.

Some believe that the "Feast of Unleavened Bread" was an agricultural festival at which the Israelites celebrated the beginning of the grain harvest.

"Passover," on the other hand, was associated with a thanksgiving sacrifice of a lamb, also called "the Passover," "the Passover lamb," or "the Passover offering."

Some believe that the propinquity of the dates of the two Festivals led to their confusion and merger.

Both texts provide regulations concerning the Passover sacrifice, but the regulations differ.  instructed the Israelites to boil the Passover sacrifice. Sommer did not find such a disagreement in this ancient Jewish literature surprising, arguing that two groups in the Biblical period agreed that the Passover sacrifice was important but disagreed on its precise details.

 and 27 link the word "Passover" (Pesach) to God's act to "pass over" (pasach) the Israelites' houses in the plague of the firstborn. In the Torah, the consolidated Passover and Feast of Unleavened Bread thus commemorate the Israelites' liberation from Egypt.

The Hebrew Bible frequently notes the Israelites' observance of Passover at turning points in their history.  reports God's direction to the Israelites to observe Passover in the wilderness of Sinai on the anniversary of their liberation from Egypt.  reports that upon entering the Promised Land, the Israelites kept the Passover on the plains of Jericho and ate unleavened cakes and parched corn, produce of the land, the next day.  reports that King Josiah commanded the Israelites to keep the Passover in Jerusalem as part of Josiah's reforms, but also notes that the Israelites had not kept such a Passover from the days of the Biblical judges nor in all the days of the kings of Israel or the kings of Judah, calling into question the observance of even Kings David and Solomon. The more reverent , however, reports that Solomon offered sacrifices on the Festivals, including the Feast of Unleavened Bread. And  reports King Hezekiah's observance of a second Passover anew, as sufficient numbers of neither the priests nor the people were prepared to do so before then. And  reports that the Israelites returned from the Babylonian captivity observed Passover, ate the Passover lamb, and kept the Feast of Unleavened Bread seven days with joy.

Shavuot
 refers to the Festival of Shavuot. In the Hebrew Bible, Shavuot is called:
The Feast of Weeks (Chag Shavuot),
The Day of the First-fruits (Yom haBikurim),
The Feast of Harvest (Chag haKatzir), and
A holy convocation (mikrah kodesh).

 associates Shavuot with the first-fruits of the wheat harvest. In turn,  set out the ceremony for the bringing of the first fruits.

To arrive at the correct date,  instructs counting seven weeks from the day after the day of rest of Passover, the day that they brought the sheaf of barley for waving. Similarly,  directs counting seven weeks from when they first put the sickle to the standing barley.

 sets out a course of offerings for the fiftieth day, including a meal-offering of two loaves made from fine flour from the first-fruits of the harvest; burnt-offerings of seven lambs, one bullock, and two rams; a sin-offering of a goat; and a peace-offering of two lambs. Similarly,  sets out a course of offerings including a meal-offering; burnt-offerings of two bullocks, one ram, and seven lambs; and one goat to make atonement.  directs a freewill-offering in relation to God's blessing.

 and  ordain a holy convocation in which the Israelites were not to work.

 reports that Solomon offered burnt-offerings on the Feast of Weeks.

Sukkot
And  refers to the Festival of Sukkot. In the Hebrew Bible, Sukkot is called:
"The Feast of Tabernacles (or Booths),"
"The Feast of Ingathering,"
"The Feast" or "the festival,"
"The Feast of the Lord,"
"The festival of the seventh month," and
"A holy convocation" or "a sacred occasion."

Sukkot's agricultural origin is evident from the name "The Feast of Ingathering," from the ceremonies accompanying it, and from the season and occasion of its celebration: "At the end of the year when you gather in your labors out of the field"; "after you have gathered in from your threshing-floor and from your winepress." It was a thanksgiving for the fruit harvest. And in what may explain the festival's name, Isaiah reports that grape harvesters kept booths in their vineyards. Coming as it did at the completion of the harvest, Sukkot was regarded as a general thanksgiving for the bounty of nature in the year that had passed.

Sukkot became one of the most important feasts in Judaism, as indicated by its designation as "the Feast of the Lord" or simply "the Feast." Perhaps because of its wide attendance, Sukkot became the appropriate time for important state ceremonies. Moses instructed the children of Israel to gather for a reading of the Law during Sukkot every seventh year. King Solomon dedicated the Temple in Jerusalem on Sukkot. And Sukkot was the first sacred occasion observed after the resumption of sacrifices in Jerusalem after the Babylonian captivity.

In the time of Nehemiah, after the Babylonian captivity, the Israelites celebrated Sukkot by making and dwelling in booths, a practice of which Nehemiah reports: "the Israelites had not done so from the days of Joshua." In a practice related to that of the Four Species, Nehemiah also reports that the Israelites found in the Law the commandment that they "go out to the mountains and bring leafy branches of olive trees, pine trees, myrtles, palms and [other] leafy trees to make booths." In , God told Moses to command the people: "On the first day you shall take the product of hadar trees, branches of palm trees, boughs of leafy trees, and willows of the brook," and "You shall live in booths seven days; all citizens in Israel shall live in booths, in order that future generations may know that I made the Israelite people live in booths when I brought them out of the land of Egypt." The book of Numbers, however, indicates that while in the wilderness, the Israelites dwelt in tents. Some secular scholars consider  (the commandments regarding booths and the four species) to be an insertion by a late redactor.

Jeroboam son of Nebat, King of the northern Kingdom of Israel, whom  describes as practicing "his evil way," celebrated a festival on the fifteenth day of the eighth month, one month after Sukkot, "in imitation of the festival in Judah." "While Jeroboam was standing on the altar to present the offering, the man of God, at the command of the Lord, cried out against the altar" in disapproval.

According to the prophet Zechariah, in the messianic era, Sukkot will become a universal festival, and all nations will make pilgrimages annually to Jerusalem to celebrate the feast there.

In early nonrabbinic interpretation

The parashah has parallels or is discussed in these early nonrabbinic sources:

Deuteronomy chapter 12

Deuteronomy chapter 14
Isaiah Gafni noted that in the Book of Tobit, the protagonist Tobit observed the dietary laws.

In classical rabbinic interpretation
The parashah is discussed in these rabbinic sources from the era of the Mishnah and the Talmud:

Deuteronomy chapter 11
Rabbi Haggai taught that not only had God in  set two paths before the Israelites, but God did not administer justice to them according to the strict letter of the law, but allowed them mercy so that they might (in the words of ) "choose life." And Rabbi Joshua ben Levi taught that when a person makes the choice that  urges and observes the words of the Torah, a procession of angels passes before the person to guard the person from evil, bringing into effect the promised blessing.

The Sifre explained that  explicitly says, "I set before you this day a blessing and a curse: the blessing, if you obey the commandments . . . and the curse, if you shall not obey the commandments," because otherwise the Israelites might read , "I have set before you life and death, the blessing and the curse," and think that since God set before them both paths, they could go whichever way they chose. Thus,  directs explicitly: "choose life."

The Sifre compared  to a person sitting at a crossroads with two paths ahead. One of the paths began with clear ground but ended in thorns. The other began with thorns but ended in clear ground. The person would tell passersby that the path that appeared clear would be fine for two or three steps, but end in thorns, and the path that began with thorns would be difficult for two or three steps, but end in clear ground. So, said the Sifre, Moses told Israel that one might see the wicked flourish in this world for a short time, but in the end they will have occasion to regret. And the righteous who are distressed in this world will in the end have occasion for rejoicing, as  says, "that He might prove you, to do you good at the end."

Our Rabbis asked in a Baraita why  says, "You shall set the blessing upon Mount Gerizim and the curse upon mount Ebal."  cannot say so merely to teach where the Israelites were to say the blessings and curses, as  already says, "These shall stand upon Mount Gerizim to bless the people . . . and these shall stand upon Mount Ebal for the curse." It is possible to think that all the blessings must precede all the curses; therefore the text states "blessing" and "curse" in the singular, and thus teaches that one blessing precedes one curse, alternating blessings and curses, and all the blessings do not precede all the curses. As the curse was uttered in a loud voice, so the blessing had to be uttered in a loud voice. As the curse was said in Hebrew, so the blessing had to be said in Hebrew. As the curses were in general and particular terms, so the blessings had to be in general and particular terms. And as with the curse both parties responded "Amen," so with the blessing both parties responded "Amen."

But Rabbi Judah deduced from the words "beyond the Jordan" in  that Gerizim and Ebal were some distance beyond the Jordan. Rabbi Judah deduced from the words "behind the way of the going down of the sun" in  that Gerizim and Ebal were far from the east, where the sun rises. And Rabbi Judah also deduced from the words "over against Gilgal" in  that Gerizim and Ebal were close to Gilgal. Rabbi Eleazar ben Jose said, however, that the words "Are they not beyond the Jordan" in  indicated that Gerizim and Ebal were near the Jordan.

The Tosefta read  to report that the Israelites miraculously traveled more than 60 mils, crossing the Jordan River and going all the way to Mount Gerizim and Mount Ebal, all in a single day.

Rabbi Hananiah ben Iddi read  to report Moses bewailing for himself—"you are to pass over the Jordan," but I am not.

Deuteronomy chapter 12
They read "the statutes" to refer to the Rabbinic interpretations of the text. They read "the ordinances" to refer to monetary, civil laws. They read "which you shall observe" to refer study. They read "to do" to refer to actual practice. Reading "in the land," one might think that all precepts are binding only in the Land of Israel; therefore  states, "all the days that you live upon the earth" to teach that the laws bind one wherever one lives. Reading "all the days," one might think that all precepts are binding both inside and outside the Land of Israel; therefore  states, "in the land." The Rabbis taught that one could thus learn from the next verse, "You shall utterly destroy all the places, wherein the nations served their God," that just as the destruction of idolatry is a personal duty, and is binding both inside and outside the Land of Israel, so everything that is a personal duty is binding both inside and outside the Land of Israel. And conversely, laws that are connected to the land are binding only in the Land of Israel.

Rabbi Jose son of Rabbi Judah derived from the use of the two instances of the verb "destroy" in the Hebrew for "you shall surely destroy" in  that the Israelites were to destroy the Canaanite's idols twice, and the Rabbis explained that this meant by cutting them and then by uprooting them from the ground. The Gemara explained that Rabbi Jose derived from the words "and you shall destroy their name out of that place" in  that the place of the idol must be renamed. And Rabbi Eliezer deduced from the same words in  that the Israelites were to eradicate every trace of the idol.

The Mishnah recounted the history of decentralized sacrifice. Before the Tabernacle, high places were permitted, and Israelite firstborn performed the sacrifices. After the Israelites set up the Tabernacle, high places were forbidden, and priests performed the services. When the Israelites entered the Promised Land and came to Gilgal, high places were again permitted. When the Israelites came to Shiloh, high places were again forbidden. The Tabernacle there had no roof, but consisted of a stone structure covered with cloth. When the Israelites came to Nob and Gibeon, high places were again permitted. And when the Israelites came to Jerusalem, high places were forbidden and never again permitted. The Mishnah explained the different practices at the various high places when high places were permitted. The Mishnah taught that there was no difference between a Great Altar (at the Tabernacle or the Temple) and a small altar (a local high place), except that the Israelites had to bring obligatory sacrifices that had a fixed time, like the Passover sacrifice, to the Great Altar. Further, the Mishnah explained that there was no difference between Shiloh and Jerusalem except that in Shiloh they ate minor sacrifices and second tithes (ma'aser sheni) anywhere within sight of Shiloh, whereas at Jerusalem they were eaten within the wall. And the sanctity of Shiloh was followed by a period when high places were permitted, while after the sanctity of Jerusalem high places were no longer permitted.

Rabbi Nehorai, on the other hand, said that  did not command the Israelites to choose a king, but was spoken only in anticipation of the Israelites' future complaints, as  says, "And (you) shall say, ‘I will set a king over me.'" A Baraita taught that because  says, "And when He gives you rest from all your enemies round about," and then proceeds, "then it shall come to pass that the place that the Lord your God shall choose," it implies that the commandment to exterminate Amalek was to come before building of the Temple.

Deuteronomy chapter 13

The Jerusalem Talmud interpreted —"a prophet . . . gives you a sign or a wonder"—to demonstrate that a prophet's authority depends on the prophet's producing a sign or wonder.

How could a prophet of other gods perform a sign or wonder that actually came to pass? Rabbi Akiva explained that  refers only to those who began as true prophets, but then turned into false prophets.

 addresses a "dream-diviner" who seeks to lead the Israelites astray. The Gemara taught that a dream is a sixtieth part of prophecy. Rabbi Hanan taught that even if the Master of Dreams (an angel, in a dream that truly foretells the future) tells a person that on the next day the person will die, the person should not desist from prayer, for as Ecclesiastes  says, "For in the multitude of dreams are vanities and also many words, but fear God." (Although a dream may seem reliably to predict the future, it will not necessarily come true; one must place one's trust in God.) Rabbi Samuel bar Nahmani said in the name of Rabbi Jonathan that a person is shown in a dream only what is suggested by the person's own thoughts (while awake), as  says, "As for you, Oh King, your thoughts came into your mind upon your bed," and  says, "That you may know the thoughts of the heart." When Samuel had a bad dream, he used to quote , "The dreams speak falsely." The Gemara resolved the contradiction, teaching that , "I speak with him in a dream?" refers to dreams that come through an angel, whereas , "The dreams speak falsely," refers to dreams that come through a demon.

Rabbi Hama son of Rabbi Hanina asked what  means in the text, "You shall walk after the Lord your God." How can a human being walk after God, when  says, "[T]he Lord your God is a devouring fire"? Rabbi Hama son of Rabbi Hanina explained that the command to walk after God means to walk after the attributes of God. As God clothes the naked—for  says, "And the Lord God made for Adam and for his wife coats of skin, and clothed them"—so should we also clothe the naked. God visited the sick—for  says, "And the Lord appeared to him by the oaks of Mamre" (after Abraham was circumcised in )—so should we also visit the sick. God comforted mourners—for  says, "And it came to pass after the death of Abraham, that God blessed Isaac his son"—so should we also comfort mourners. God buried the dead—for  says, "And He buried him in the valley"—so should we also bury the dead. Similarly, the Sifre on  taught that to walk in God's ways means to be (in the words of ) "merciful and gracious."

Rabbi Elazar reasoned from the common use of the term "child of Belial" that the context was the same in both verses.

The Mishnah taught that a court would examine witnesses in capital cases with seven questions: (1) In which cycle of seven years within a jubilee did the event occur? (2) In which year of the Sabbatical cycle did the event occur? (3) In which month did the event occur? (4) On which day of the month did the event occur? (5) On which day of the week did the event occur? (6) At which hour did the event occur? And (7) in what place did the event occur? Rabbi Yosei said that the court would examine the witnesses with only three questions: On which day did the event occur, at which hour, and in what place?

The Gemara taught that  sets forth one of the three most distinguishing virtues of the Jewish People. The Gemara taught that David told the Gibeonites that the Israelites are distinguished by three characteristics: They are merciful, bashful, and benevolent. They are merciful, for  says that God would "show you [the Israelites] mercy, and have compassion upon you, and multiply you." And they are benevolent, for  says of Abraham "that he may command his children and his household after him, that they may keep the way of the Lord, to do righteousness and justice." The Gemara taught that David told the Gibeonites that only one who cultivates these three characteristics is fit to join the Jewish People.

Mishnah Sanhedrin 10:4–6, Tosefta Sanhedrin 14:1–6, and Babylonian Talmud Sanhedrin 111b–13b interpreted  to address the law of the apostate town. The Mishnah held that only a court of 71 judges could declare such a city, and the court could not declare cities on the frontier or three cities within one locale to be apostate cities. A Baraita taught that there never was an apostate town and never will be. You shall not do so to the Lord your God," and thus forbids destroying the Name of God. Rabbi Jonathan, however, said that he saw an apostate town and sat upon its ruins. See under Ir nidachat.

Deuteronomy chapter 14

Rav Chisda explained that Noah led them past the Ark, and those that the Ark accepted (in multiples of seven) were certainly clean, and those that the Ark rejected were certainly unclean. Rabbi Abbahu cited , "And they that went in, went in male and female," to show that they went in of their own accord (in their respective pairs, seven of the clean and two of the unclean).

Rabbi Tanhum ben Hanilai compared the laws of kashrut to the case of a physician who went to visit two patients, one whom the physician judged would live, and the other whom the physician judged would die. To the one who would live, the physician gave orders about what to eat and what not to eat. On the other hand, the physician told the one who would die to eat whatever the patient wanted.

Rav reasoned that since  teaches that "Every word of God is pure," then the precepts of kashrut were given for the express purpose of purifying humanity.

Reading , "My ordinances (mishpatai) shall you do, and My statutes (chukotai) shall you keep," the Sifra distinguished "ordinances" (mishpatim) from "statutes" (chukim). The term "ordinances" (mishpatim), taught the Sifra, refers to rules that even had they not been written in the Torah, it would have been entirely logical to write them, like laws pertaining to theft, sexual immorality, idolatry, blasphemy and murder. In regard to these, taught the Sifra, the Torah says simply that God legislated them and we have no right to raise doubts about them.

So one should separate from transgression and accept the rule of Heaven.

Rabbi Berekiah said in the name of Rabbi Isaac that in the Time to Come, God will make a banquet for God's righteous servants, and whoever had not eaten meat from an animal that died other than through ritual slaughtering (nebeilah, prohibited by ) in this world will have the privilege of enjoying it in the World to Come. (By one's present self-restraint one might merit to partake of the banquet in the Hereafter.)

A Midrash interpreted Psalm , "The Lord lets loose the prisoners," to read, "The Lord permits the forbidden," and thus to teach that what God forbade in one case, God permitted in another. God forbade the abdominal fat of cattle (in ), but permitted it in the case of beasts. God forbade consuming the sciatic nerve in animals (in ) but permitted it in fowl. God forbade eating meat without ritual slaughter (in ) but permitted it for fish. Similarly, Rabbi Abba and Rabbi Jonathan in the name of Rabbi Levi taught that God permitted more things than God forbade.

The Mishnah noted that the Torah does not similarly state the characteristics of birds, but the sages taught that every bird that seizes its prey is unclean. Every bird that has an extra toe (a hallux), a crop, and a gizzard that can be peeled off is clean. Rabbi Eliezer the son of Rabbi Zadok taught that every bird that parts its toes (evenly) is unclean. The Mishnah taught that among locusts, all that have four legs, four wings, jointed legs (as in ), and wings covering the greater part of the body are clean. Rabbi Jose taught that it must also bear the name "locust." The Mishnah taught that among fish, all that have fins and scales are clean. Rabbi Judah said that it must have (at least) two scales and one fin (to be clean). The scales are those (thin discs) that are attached to the fish, and the fins are those (wings) by which it swims.

The Mishnah taught that hunters of wild animals, birds, and fish, who chanced upon animals that  defined as unclean were allowed to sell them. Rabbi Judah taught that a person who chanced upon such animals by accident was allowed to buy or sell them, provided that the person did not make a regular trade of it. But the sages did not allow it.

Rav Shaman bar Abba said in the name of Rav Idi bar Idi bar Gershom who said it in the name of Levi bar Perata who said it in the name of Rabbi Nahum who said it in the name of Rabbi Biraim who said it in the name of a certain old man named Rabbi Jacob that those of the Nasi's house taught that (cooking) a forbidden egg among 60 (permitted) eggs renders them all forbidden, (but cooking) a forbidden egg among 61 (permitted) eggs renders them all permitted. Rabbi Zera questioned the ruling, but the Gemara cited the definitive ruling: It was stated that Rabbi Helbo said in the name of Rav Huna that with regard to a (forbidden) egg (cooked with permitted ones), if there are 60 besides the (forbidden) one, they are (all) forbidden, but if there are 61 besides the (forbidden) one, they are permitted.

The Mishnah taught the general rule that wherever the flavor from a prohibited food yields benefit, it is prohibited, but wherever the flavor from a prohibited food does not yield benefit, it is permitted. For example, if (prohibited) vinegar fell into split beans (it is permitted).

Rabbi Phinehas (and other say Rabbi Helkiah) taught in Rabbi Simon's name that Moses and Asaph (author of ) exposed the Romans' deception. Asaph said in  "The boar of the wood ravages it." The Midrash explained that Scripture compares the Roman Empire to a swine, because when the swine lies down, it puts out its parted hoofs, as if to advertise that it is clean. And so the Midrash taught that the wicked Roman Empire robbed and oppressed, yet pretended to execute justice. So the Midrash taught that for 40 years, Esau would ensnare married women and violate them, yet when he reached the age of 40, he compared himself to his righteous father Isaac, telling himself that as his father Isaac was 40 years old when he married (as reported in ), so he too would marry at the age of 40.

The Gemara interpreted the word "living" to mean those whose principal limbs are living (excluding birds that are missing a limb) and to exclude treifah birds (birds with an injury or defect that would prevent them from living out a year). The Gemara interpreted the word "birds" (zipparim) to mean kosher birds. And the Gemara taught that  repeats the commandment so as to teach that one who consumes a bird slaughtered pursuant to  infringes both a positive and a negative commandment.

The Gemara noted the paradox that mother's milk is kosher even though it is a product of the mother's blood, which is not kosher. In explanation, the Gemara quoted  “Who can bring a pure thing out of an impure? Is it not the One?” For God can bring a pure thing, such as milk, out of an impure thing, such as blood.

Without good, as  says that "it is not good that the man should be alone." Without joy, as  says, "And you shall rejoice, you and your household" (implying that one can rejoice only when there is a "household" with whom to rejoice). Without a blessing, as  can be read, "To cause a blessing to rest on you for the sake of your house" (that is, for the sake of your wife). Without atonement, as  says, "And he shall make atonement for himself, and for his house" (implying that one can make complete atonement only with a household). Rabbi Simeon said in the name of Rabbi Joshua ben Levi, without peace too, as 1 Samuel  says, "And peace be to your house." Rabbi Joshua of Siknin said in the name of Rabbi Levi, without life too, as  says, "Enjoy life with the wife whom you love." Rabbi Hiyya ben Gomdi said, also incomplete, as  says, "male and female created He them, and blessed them, and called their name Adam," that is, "man" (and thus only together are they "man"). Some say a man without a wife even impairs the Divine likeness, as  says, "For in the image of God made He man," and immediately thereafter  says, "And you, be fruitful, and multiply (implying that the former is impaired if one does not fulfill the latter).

Mishnah Peah 8:5–9, Tosefta Peah 4:2–10, and Jerusalem Talmud Peah 69b–73b interpreted  and  regarding the tithe given to the poor and the Levite. The Mishnah thus taught that they did not give the poor person at the threshing floor less than a half a kav (the equivalent in volume of 12 eggs, or roughly a liter) of wheat or a kav (roughly two liters) of barley. The Mishnah taught that they did not give the poor person wandering from place to place less than a loaf of bread. If the poor person stayed overnight, they gave the poor person enough to pay for a night's lodging. If the poor person stayed for the Sabbath, they gave the poor person three meals. The Mishnah taught that if one wanted to save some for poor relatives, one could take only half for poor relatives and needed to give at least half to other poor people.

And for those who do not give to the poor, it is accounted to them as if the Temple existed and they did not offer up their sacrifices in it.

Deuteronomy chapter 15
The Mishnah asked until when a field with trees could be plowed in the sixth year. The House of Shammai said as long as such work would benefit fruit that would ripen in the sixth year. But the House of Hillel said until Shavuot. The Mishnah observed that in reality, the views of two schools approximate each other. The Mishnah taught that one could plow a grain-field in the sixth year until the moisture had dried up in the soil (that it, after Passover, when rains in the Land of Israel cease) or as long as people still plowed in order to plant cucumbers and gourds (which need a great deal of moisture). Rabbi Simeon objected that if that were the rule, then we would place the law in the hands of each person to decide. But the Mishnah concluded that the prescribed period in the case of a grain-field was until Passover, and in the case of a field with trees, until Shavuot. But Rabban Gamaliel and his court ordained that working the land was permitted until the New Year that began the seventh year. Thus, just as in the case of the Sabbath Day, work is forbidden on the day itself, but allowed on the day before and the day after, so likewise in the Sabbath Year, tillage is forbidden during the year itself, but allowed in the year before and the year after.

Chapter 10 of Tractate Sheviit in the Mishnah and Jerusalem Talmud and Tosefta Sheviit 8:3–11 interpreted  to address debts and the Sabbatical year. The Mishnah held that the Sabbatical year cancelled loans, whether they were secured by a bond or not, but did not cancel debts to a shopkeeper or unpaid wages of a laborer, unless these debts were made into loans. Citing the literal meaning of —"this is the word of the release"—the Mishnah held that a creditor could accept payment of a debt notwithstanding an intervening Sabbatical year, if the creditor had first by word told the debtor that the creditor relinquished the debt. A prosbul prevents the remission of debts in the Sabbatical year. The text of the prosbul says: "I hand over to you, So-and-so, the judges in such-and-such a place, my bonds, so that I may be able to recover any money owing to me from So-and-so at any time I shall desire." And the judges or witnesses signed.

Rabbi Isaac said that we often find that a person fulfills a precept for a day, a week, or a month, but it is remarkable to find one who does so for an entire year. Rabbi Isaac asked whether one could find a mightier person than one who sees his field untilled, see his vineyard untilled, and yet pays his taxes and does not complain. And Rabbi Isaac noted that  uses the words "that fulfill His word (dabar)," and  says regarding observance of the Sabbatical year, "And this is the manner (dabar) of the release," and argued that "dabar" means the observance of the Sabbatical year in both places.

Rabbi Abin observed that when a poor person stands at one's door, God stands at the person's right, as  says: "Because He stands at the right hand of the needy." If one gives something to a poor person, one should reflect that the One who stands at the poor person's right will reward the giver. And if one does not give anything to a poor person, one should reflect that the One who stands at the poor person's right will punish the one who did not give, as  says: "He stands at the right hand of the needy, to save him from them that judge his soul."

Based on these words, the Rabbis taught in a Baraita that if an orphan applied to the community for assistance to marry, the community must rent a house, supply a bed and necessary household furnishings, and put on the wedding, as  says, "sufficient for his need, whatever is lacking for him." The Rabbis interpreted the words "sufficient for his need" to refer to the house, "whatever is lacking" to refer to a bed and a table, and "for him (lo)" to refer to a wife, as  uses the same term, "for him (lo)," to refer to Adam's wife, whom  calls "a helpmate for him." The Rabbis taught that the words "sufficient for his need" command us to maintain the poor person, but not to make the poor person rich. But the Gemara interpreted the words "whatever is lacking for him" to include even a horse to ride upon and a servant to run before the impoverished person, if that was what the particular person lacked. The Gemara told that once Hillel bought for a certain impoverished man from an affluent family a horse to ride upon and a servant to run before him, and once when Hillel could not find a servant to run before the impoverished man, Hillel himself ran before him for three miles. The Rabbis taught in a Baraita that once the people of Upper Galilee bought a pound of meat every day for an impoverished member of an affluent family of Sepphoris. Rav Huna taught that they bought for him a pound of premium poultry, or if you prefer, the amount of ordinary meat that they could buy with a pound of money. Rav Ashi taught that the place was such a small village with so few buyers for meat that every day they had to waste a whole animal just to provide for the pauper's needs. Once when a pauper applied to Rabbi Nehemiah for support, Rabbi Nehemiah asked him of what his meals consisted. The pauper told Rabbi Nehemiah that he had been used to eating well-marbled meat and aged wine. Rabbi Nehemiah asked him whether he could get by with Rabbi Nehemiah on a diet of lentils. The pauper consented, joined Rabbi Nehemiah on a diet of lentils, and then died. Rabbi Nehemiah lamented that he had caused the pauper's death by not feeding him the diet to which he had been accustomed, but the Gemara answered that the pauper himself was responsible for his own death, for he should not have allowed himself to become dependent on such a luxurious diet. Once when a pauper applied to Rava for support, Rava asked him of what his meals consisted. The pauper told Rava that he had been used to eating fattened chicken and aged wine. Rava asked the pauper whether he considered the burden on the community of maintaining such a lifestyle. The pauper replied that he was not eating what the community provided, but what God provided, as  says: "The eyes of all wait for You, and You give them their food in due season." As the verse does not say "in their season" (in the plural), but "in His season" (in the singular), it teaches that God provides every person the food that the person needs. Just then, Rava's sister, who had not seen him for 13 years, arrived with a fattened chicken and aged wine. Thereupon, Rava exclaimed at the coincidence, apologized to the pauper, and invited him to come and eat.

The Gemara turned to how the community should convey assistance to the pauper. Rabbi Meir taught that if a person has no means but does not wish to receive support from the community's charity fund, then the community should give the person what the person requires as a loan and then convert the loan into a gift by not collecting repayment. The Sages, however, said (as Rava explained their position) that the community should offer the pauper assistance as a gift, and then if the pauper declines the gift, the community should extend funds to the pauper as a loan. The Gemara taught that if a person has the means for self-support but chooses rather to rely on the community, then the community may give the person what the person needs as a gift, and then make the person repay it. As requiring repayment would surely cause the person to decline assistance on a second occasion, Rav Papa explained that the community exacts repayment from the person's estate upon the person's death. Rabbi Simeon taught that the community need not become involved if a person who has the means for self-support chooses not to do so. Rabbi Simeon taught that if a person has no means but does not wish to receive support from the community's charity fund, then the community should ask for a pledge in exchange for a loan, so as thereby to raise the person's self-esteem. The Rabbis taught in a Baraita that the instruction to "lend" in  refers to the person who has no means and is unwilling to receive assistance from the community's charity fund, and to whom the community must thus offer assistance as a loan and then give it as a gift. Rabbi Judah taught that the words "you . . . shall surely lend him" in  refer to the person who has the means for self-support but chooses rather to rely on the community, to whom the community should give what the person needs as a gift, and then exact repayment from the person's estate upon the person's death. The Sages, however, said that the community has no obligation to help the person who has the means of self-support.

The Gemara related a story about how to give to the poor. A poor man lived in Mar Ukba's neighborhood, and every day Mar Ukba would put four zuz into the poor man's door socket. One day, the poor man thought that he would try to find out who did him this kindness. That day Mar Ukba came home from the house of study with his wife. When the poor man saw them moving the door to make their donation, the poor man went to greet them, but they fled and ran into a furnace from which the fire had just been swept. They did so because, as Mar Zutra bar Tobiah said in the name of Rav (or others say Rav Huna bar Bizna said in the name of Rabbi Simeon the Pious, and still others say Rabbi Johanan said in the name of Rabbi Simeon ben Yohai), it is better for a person to go into a fiery furnace than to shame a neighbor publicly.

The Gemara related another story of Mar Ukba's charity. A poor man lived in Mar Ukba's neighborhood to whom he regularly sent 400 zuz on the eve of every Yom Kippur. Once Mar Ukba sent his son to deliver the 400 zuz. His son came back and reported that the poor man did not need Mar Ukba's help. When Mar Ukba asked his son what he had seen, his son replied that they were sprinkling aged wine before the poor man to improve the aroma in the room. Mar Ukba said that if the poor man was that delicate, then Mar Ukba would double the amount of his gift and send it back to the poor man.

When Mar Ukba was about to die, he asked to see his charity accounts. Finding gifts worth 7,000 Sijan gold denarii recorded therein, he exclaimed that the provisions were scanty and the road was long, and he forthwith distributed half of his wealth to charity. The Gemara asked how Mar Ukba could have given away so much, when Rabbi Elai taught that when the Sanhedrin sat at Usha, it ordained that if a person wishes to give liberally the person should not give more than a fifth of the person's wealth. The Gemara explained that this limitation applies only during a person's lifetime, as the person might thereby be impoverished, but the limitation does not apply to gifts at death.

The Gemara related another story about a Sage's charity. Rabbi Abba used to bind money in his scarf, sling it on his back, and go among the poor so that they could take the funds they needed from his scarf. He would, however, look sideways as a precaution against swindlers.

Rabbi Hiyya bar Rav of Difti taught that Rabbi Joshua ben Korha deduced from the parallel use of the term "base" with regard to withholding charity and practicing idolatry that people who shut their eyes against charity are like those who worship idols.  says regarding aid to the poor, "Beware that there be not a base thought in your heart . . . and your eye will be evil against your poor brother," while  uses the same term "base" when it says regarding idolatry, "Certain base fellows are gone out from the midst of you . . . saying: ‘Let us go and serve other gods there.'" That Deuteronomy employs the same adjective for both failings implies that withholding charity and practicing idolatry are similar.

In , the heart is troubled. A Midrash catalogued the wide range of additional capabilities of the heart reported in the Hebrew Bible. The heart speaks, sees, hears, walks, falls, stands, rejoices, cries, is comforted, becomes hardened, grows faint, grieves, fears, can be broken, becomes proud, rebels, invents, cavils, overflows, devises, desires, goes astray, lusts, is refreshed, can be stolen, is humbled, is enticed, errs, trembles, is awakened, loves, hates, envies, is searched, is rent, meditates, is like a fire, is like a stone, turns in repentance, becomes hot, dies, melts, takes in words, is susceptible to fear, gives thanks, covets, becomes hard, makes merry, acts deceitfully, speaks from out of itself, loves bribes, writes words, plans, receives commandments, acts with pride, makes arrangements, and aggrandizes itself.

Samuel read  to teach that even the basic norms of society will remain the same in the Messianic Age. Rabbi Hiyya bar Abba said in the name of Rabbi Johanan that all the prophets prophesied only about the Messianic Age, but as for the World to Come, no eye has seen, beside God's. On this, Rabbi Hiyya bar Abba and Rabbi Johanan differed with Samuel, for Samuel taught that there is no difference between this world and the Messianic Age except that in the Messianic Age Jews will be independent of foreign powers, as  says: "For the poor shall never cease out of the land" (implying that social stratification will remain in the Messianic Age).

The Rabbis taught in a Baraita that the words of  regarding the Hebrew servant, "he fares well with you," indicate that the Hebrew servant had to be "with"—that is, equal to—the master in food and drink. Thus the master could not eat white bread and have the servant eat black bread. The master could not drink old wine and have the servant drink new wine. The master could not sleep on a feather bed and have the servant sleep on straw. Hence, they said that buying a Hebrew servant was like buying a master.

Deuteronomy chapter 16

The Mishnah taught that the prohibitions of  that "seven days shall there be no leaven found in your houses" and of  that "no leaven shall be seen in all your territory" applied to the first Passover; while at the second Passover, one could have both leavened and unleavened bread in one's house. And the Mishnah taught that for the first Passover, one was required to recite the Hallel when the Passover lamb was eaten; while the second Passover did not require the reciting of Hallel when the Passover lamb was eaten. But both the first and second Passovers required the reciting of Hallel when the Passover lambs were offered, and both Passover lambs were eaten roasted with unleavened bread and bitter herbs. And both the first and second Passovers took precedence over the Sabbath.

The wise child asks, in the words of  "What mean the testimonies, and the statutes, and the ordinances, that the Lord our God has commanded you?" The Mekhilta taught that we explain to this child all the laws of Passover. The simple child asks, in the words of  "What is this?" The Mekhilta taught that we respond simply with the words of  "By strength of hand the Lord brought us out from Egypt, from the house of bondage." The wicked child asks, in the words of  "What do you mean by this service?" The Mekhilta taught that because wicked children exclude themselves, we should also exclude this child in answering and say, in the words of  "It is because of what the Lord did for me when I came forth out of Egypt"—for me but not for you; had you been there, you would not have been saved. As for the child who does not know how to ask, the Mekhilta taught that we take the initiative, as  says (without having reported that the child asked), "You shall tell your child on that day."

Rabbi Elazar ben Azariah argued that Jews must mention the Exodus every night, but did not prevail in his argument until Ben Zoma argued that , which commands a Jew to remember the Exodus "all the days of your life," used the word "all" to mean both day and night.

Rabbi Huna taught in Hezekiah's name that  can help reveal when Isaac was born. Reading , “And Sarah conceived, and bore Abraham a son (Isaac) in his old age, at the set time (mo'ed) of which God had spoken to him,” Rabbi Huna taught in Hezekiah's name that Isaac was born at midday.

Rabbi Joshua maintained that rejoicing on a Festival is a religious duty. For it was taught in a Baraita: Rabbi Eliezer said: A person has nothing else to do on a Festival aside from either eating and drinking or sitting and studying. Rabbi Joshua said: Divide it: Devote half of the Festival to eating and drinking, and half to the House of Study. Rabbi Johanan said: Both deduce this from the same verse. One verse  says, “a solemn assembly to the Lord your God,” while  says, “there shall be a solemn assembly to you.” Rabbi Eliezer held that this means either entirely to God or entirely to you. But Rabbi Joshua held: Divide it: Devote half the Festival to God and half to yourself.

The Mishnah reported that Jews read  on Shavuot. So as to maintain a logical unit including at least 15 verses, Jews now read  on Shavuot.

The Mishnah taught that a sukkah can be no more than 20 cubits high. Rabbi Judah, however, declared taller sukkot valid. The Mishnah taught that a sukkah must be at least 10 handbreadths high, have three walls, and have more shade than sun. The House of Shammai declared invalid a sukkah made 30 days or more before the festival, but the House of Hillel pronounced it valid. The Mishnah taught that if one made the sukkah for the purpose of the festival, even at the beginning of the year, it is valid.

The Mishnah taught that a sukkah under a tree is as invalid as a sukkah within a house. If one sukkah is erected above another, the upper one is valid, but the lower is invalid. Rabbi Judah said that if there are no occupants in the upper one, then the lower one is valid.

It invalidates a sukkah to spread a sheet over the sukkah because of the sun, or beneath it because of falling leaves, or over the frame of a four-post bed. One may spread a sheet, however, over the frame of a two-post bed.

It is not valid to train a vine, gourd, or ivy to cover a sukkah and then cover it with sukkah covering (s'chach). If, however, the sukkah-covering exceeds the vine, gourd, or ivy in quantity, or if the vine, gourd, or ivy is detached, it is valid. The general rule is that one may not use for sukkah-covering anything that is susceptible to ritual impurity (tumah) or that does not grow from the soil. But one may use for sukkah-covering anything not susceptible to ritual impurity that grows from the soil.

Bundles of straw, wood, or brushwood may not serve as sukkah-covering. But any of them, if they are untied, are valid. All materials are valid for the walls.

Rabbi Judah taught that one may use planks for the sukkah-covering, but Rabbi Meir taught that one may not. The Mishnah taught that it is valid to place a plank four handbreadths wide over the sukkah, provided that one does not sleep under it.

The Rabbis taught that Jews are duty bound to make their children and their household rejoice on a Festival, for  says, "And you shall rejoice it, your feast, you and your son and your daughter." The Gemara taught that one makes them rejoice with wine. Rabbi Judah taught that men gladden with what is suitable for them, and women with what is suitable for them. The Gemara explained that what is suitable for men is wine. And Rav Joseph taught that in Babylonia, they gladdened women with colored garments, while in the Land of Israel, they gladdened women with pressed linen garments.

A Baraita deduced from the words "that they may hear" in  that a deaf person was not required to appear at the assembly. And the Baraita deduced from the words "that they may learn" in  that a mute person was not required to appear at the assembly. But the Gemara questioned the conclusion that one who cannot talk cannot learn, recounting the story of two mute grandsons (or others say nephews) of Rabbi Johanan ben Gudgada who lived in Rabbi's neighborhood. Rabbi prayed for them, and they were healed. And it turned out that notwithstanding their speech impediment, they had learned halachah, Sifra, Sifre, and the whole Talmud. Rabbi Tanhum deduced from the words "in their ears" (using the plural for "ears") at the end of  that one who was deaf in one ear was exempt from appearing at the assembly.

The first chapter of Tractate Chagigah in the Mishnah, Tosefta, Jerusalem Talmud, and Babylonian Talmud interpreted  regarding the obligation to bring an offering on the three pilgrim festivals.

In medieval Jewish interpretation
The parashah is discussed in these medieval Jewish sources:

Deuteronomy chapter 11
Maimonides taught that God grants free will to all people. One can choose to turn to good or evil.

Maimonides taught that people should not entertain the foolish thesis that at the time of their creation, God decrees whether they will be righteous or wicked (what some call "predestination"). Rather, each person is fit to be righteous or wicked. Jeremiah implied this in  "From the mouth of the Most High, neither evil nor good come forth." Accordingly, sinners, themselves, cause their own loss. It is thus proper for people to mourn for their sins and for the evil consequences that they have brought upon their own souls. Jeremiah continues that since free choice is in our hands and our own decision prompts us to commit wrongs, it is proper for us to repent and abandon our wickedness, for the choice is in our hands.

Maimonides taught that this principle is a pillar on which rests the Torah and the commandments, as  says, "Behold, I have set before you today life and good, death and evil," and  says, "Behold, I have set before you today the blessing and the curse," implying that the choice is in our hands.

Maimonides argued that the idea that God decrees that an individual is righteous or wicked (as imagined by astrology) is inconsistent with God's command through the prophets to "do this" or "not do this." For according to this mistaken conception, from the beginning of humanity's creation, their nature would draw them to a particular quality and they could not depart from it. Maimonides saw such a view as inconsistent with the entire Torah, with the justice of retribution for the wicked or reward for the righteous, and with the idea that the world's Judge acts justly.

Maimonides taught that even so, nothing happens in the world without God's permission and desire, as  says, "Whatever God wishes, He has done in the heavens and in the earth." Maimonides said that everything happens in accord with God's will, and, nevertheless, we are responsible for our deeds. Explaining how this apparent contradiction is resolved, Maimonides said that just as God desired that fire rises upward and water descends downward, so too, God desired that people have free choice and be responsible for their deeds, without being pulled or forced. Rather, people, on their own initiative, with the knowledge that God granted them, do anything that people are able to do. Therefore, people are judged according to their deeds. If they do good, they are treated with beneficence. If they do bad, they are treated harshly. This is implied by the prophets.

Maimonides acknowledged that one might ask: Since God knows everything that will occur before it comes to pass, does God not know whether a person will be righteous or wicked? And if God knows that a person will be righteous, it would appear impossible for that person not to be righteous. However, if one would say that despite God's knowledge that the person would be righteous it is possible for the person to be wicked, then God's knowledge would be incomplete. Maimonides taught that just as it is beyond human potential to comprehend God's essential nature, as  says, "No man will perceive Me and live," so, too, it is beyond human potential to comprehend God's knowledge. This was what Isaiah intended when  says, "For My thoughts are not your thoughts, nor your ways, My ways." Accordingly, we do not have the potential to conceive how God knows all the creations and their deeds. But Maimonides said that it is without doubt that people's actions are in their own hands and God does not decree them. Consequently, the prophets taught that people are judged according to their deeds.

Deuteronomy chapter 12
Maimonides noted that in nature, God created animals that develop gradually. For example, when a mammal is born, it is extremely tender, and cannot eat dry food, so God provided breasts that yield milk to feed the young animal, until it can eat dry food. Similarly, Maimonides taught, God instituted many laws as temporary measures, as it would have been impossible for the Israelites suddenly to discontinue everything to which they had become accustomed. So God sent Moses to make the Israelites (in the words of ) "a kingdom of priests and a holy nation." But the general custom of worship in those days was sacrificing animals in temples that contained idols. So God did not command the Israelites to give up those manners of service, but allowed them to continue. God transferred to God's service what had formerly served as a worship of idols, and commanded the Israelites to serve God in the same manner—namely, to build to a Sanctuary, to erect the altar to God's name, to offer sacrifices to God, to bow down to God, and to burn incense before God. By this Divine plan, God blotted out the traces of idolatry, and established the great principle of the Existence and Unity of God. But the sacrificial service, Maimonides taught, was not the primary object of God's commandments about sacrifice; rather, supplications, prayers, and similar kinds of worship are nearer to the primary object. Thus God limited sacrifice to only one temple (see ) and the priesthood to only the members of a particular family. These restrictions, Maimonides taught, served to limit sacrificial worship, and kept it within such bounds that God did not feel it necessary to abolish sacrificial service altogether. But in the Divine plan, prayer and supplication can be offered everywhere and by every person, as can be the wearing of tzitzit and tefillin (16) and similar kinds of service.

Deuteronomy chapter 13
Citing , Baḥya ibn Paquda taught that love and reverence for God is a leading example of an affirmative duty of the heart. And citing , Baḥya taught that not to harden one’s heart against the poor is a leading example of an negative duty of the heart.

Baḥya ibn Paquda read , "neither shall you pity him, have mercy upon him, nor shield him," to teach that ruthlessness is appropriate in paying back the wicked and exacting vengeance on the corrupt.

Deuteronomy chapter 14
Baḥya ibn Paquda taught that whenever God shows special goodness to people, they are obligated to serve God. When God increases God's favor to a person, that person is obligated to render additional service for it. Baḥya taught that this is illustrated by the duty to tithe produce, as  says, "You shall tithe all the yield of your seed that comes from the field year by year." One to whom God has given one hundred measures of produce is obliged to give ten measures; one to whom God has given only ten measures has to give one measure. If the former were to separate nine and a half measures and the latter were to separate one measure, the former would be punished, while the latter would be rewarded. Analogously, if God singles out a person for special favor, that person is under an obligation of increased service as an expression of gratitude for that favor.

Deuteronomy chapter 15
Maimonides continued that the Law taught how far we have to extend this principle of treating kindly every one with whom we have some relationship—even if the other person offended or wronged us, even if the other person is very bad, we still must have some consideration for the other person. Thus  says: "You shall not abhor an Edomite, for he is your brother." And if we find a person in trouble, whose assistance we once enjoyed, or of whom we have received some benefit, even if that person has subsequently wronged us, we must bear in mind that person's previous good conduct. Thus  says: "You shall not abhor an Egyptian, because you were a stranger in his land," although the Egyptians subsequently oppressed the Israelites very much.

Deuteronomy chapter 16

The Daas Zekeinim explained that it was only at the completion of the harvest and Sukkot that one was able to be completely joyful.

But Rashi noted that the Rabbis deduced from this language an obligation to include the night before the last day of the Festival (Shemini Atzeret) in the obligation to rejoice.

In modern interpretation
The parashah is discussed in these modern sources:

Deuteronomy chapters 11–29
Peter Craigie saw in  the following chiastic structure centered on the specific legislation, stressing the importance of the blessing and curse contingent upon obedience to the legislation both in the present and in the future.

A: The blessing and curse in the present renewal of the covenant
B: The blessing and curse in the future renewal of the covenant
C: The specific legislation
B1:The blessing and curse in the future renewal of the covenant
A1:The blessing and curse in the present renewal of the covenant

Deuteronomy chapter 12
In referring to "the place God chooses, to put his name for His dwelling place,"  and 11 never mention the name of the place. According to the Jamieson-Fausset-Brown Bible Commentary, the place was "successively Mizpeh, Shiloh, and especially Jerusalem." This commentary suggests that this studied silence was maintained partly to prevent the Canaanites within whose territories it lay to concentrate their forces to frustrate all hopes of obtaining it, and partly to prevent the desire of possessing a place of such importance from becoming a cause of strife or rivalry amongst the Hebrew tribes.

Gerhard von Rad argued that the ordinances for standardizing the cult and establishing only one sanctuary are the most distinctive feature in Deuteronomy's new arrangements for ordering Israel's life before God. Von Rad cited ; ; ; ; ; ; and  among a small number of “centralizing laws” that he argued belong closely together and were a special, later stratum in Deuteronomy. Von Rad wrote that the centralizing law appears in a triple form in —verses 2–7, 8–12, and 13–19—each built on the statement, which Von Rad called the real centralizing formula, that Israel be allowed to offer sacrifices solely in that place that God would choose in one of the tribes “to make His name dwell there.” Von Rad argued that these texts indicate that Israel's cult had become completely lacking in unity, celebrating at former Canaanite shrines intended for Baal. The instructions to centralize the cult sprang from the conviction that the cult in the different country shrines could no longer be reincorporated into the ordinances of a pure faith in God. Jewish educators Sorel Goldberg Loeb and Barbara Binder Kadden wrote that Von Rad saw the Book of Deuteronomy and this section in particular as a way of getting the Israelites back on track, as the Israelites had been influenced by other nations whose worship habits did not coincide with the Israelite belief system.

Comparing the three versions—, 8–12, and 13–19—Von Rad argued that  addressed the non-Israelite cultic practice of the Canaanites, taking an aggressive attitude because the Canaanite cults had been brought back to life within the Israelite cultic domain.  explains the new position historically, demanding that the Israelites not act as before. Von Rad noted that  alone of the three is composed in the second person singular and was thus the earliest. It begins at once with the demand for centralization, and explicitly draws the conclusion that the other two versions appear to assume tacitly, that slaughtering for secular use is permitted.

Jeffrey Tigay called the requirement that sacrifices be offered only in a single sanctuary "the most singular" of all the laws in Deuteronomy. Tigay reported eight major approaches to why Deuteronomy called for this reformation: (1) To minimize the role of sacrifice in worship, in preference to prayer. (See Maimonides in "In medieval Jewish interpretation" above.) (2) To preserve the Temple's ability to inspire people by keeping it unique. (3) Hezekiah's political goals to concentrate national enthusiasm on the preservation of the capital from the invading Assyrians. (4) Josiah's economic goal to wrest control of the peasantry's agricultural surplus from the rural Levites to use for royal purposes such as defense. (5) Monotheism, connecting the requirement for a single sanctuary to the belief that there is only one God. (See Josephus in "In early nonrabbinic interpretation" above.) (6) Monolatry, forcing the people to bring to God the sacrifices that they had been making out in the field to goat-demons (satyrs) or other gods. (7) Monoyahwism, to avoid the suggestion that there were several deities named YHVH. (8) Multiple worship sites were inherently pagan. Tigay concluded that the view that sacrificing at multiple sites was considered inherently pagan is the only explanation with explicit textual support from the passage that forbids the practice.

Deuteronomy chapter 14

James Kugel reported that Israel Finkelstein found no pig bones in hilltop sites starting in the Iron I period (roughly 1200–1000 BCE) and continuing through Iron II, while before that, in Bronze Age sites, pig bones abounded. Kugel deduced from Finkelstein's data that the new hilltop residents were fundamentally different from both their predecessors in the highlands and the city Canaanites—either because they were a different ethnic group, or because they had adopted a different way of life, for ideological or other reasons. Kugel inferred from Finkelstein's findings that these highlanders shared some ideology (if only a food taboo), like modern-day Jews and Muslims. And Kugel concluded that the discontinuities between their way of life and that of the Canaanite city dwellers and earlier highland settlers supported the idea that the settlers were not exurbanites.

Similarly, in the late 1990s, the Central Conference of American Rabbis of Reform Judaism ruled that it is a good thing for a Jew who observes kashrut to participate in a medical experiment involving a pork byproduct.

Deuteronomy chapter 16
Julius Wellhausen conceived of early Israelite religion as linked to nature's annual cycle and believed that Scripture only later connected the festivals to historical events like the Exodus from Egypt. Kugel reported that modern scholars generally agreed that Passover reflects two originally separate holidays arising out of the annual harvest cycle. One festival involved the sacrificing and eating of an animal from the flock, the pesa sacrifice, which arose among shepherds who sacrificed in the light of the full moon of the month that marked the vernal equinox and the end of winter (as directed in ) to bring divine favor for a safe and prosperous summer for the rest of the flock. The shepherds slaughtered the animal at home, as the rite also stipulated that some of the animal's blood be daubed on the doorposts and lintel of the house (as directed in ) to ward off evil. The rite prescribed that no bone be broken (as directed in ) so as not to bring evil on the flock from which the sacrifice came. A second festival—the Festival of Unleavened Bread—involved farmers eating unleavened barley bread for seven days when the winter's barley crop had reached maturity and was ready for harvest. Modern scholars believe that the absence of yeast in the bread indicated purity (as in ). Modern scholars suggest that the farmers’ Festival of Unleavened Bread and the shepherds’ Passover later merged into a single festival, Passover moved from the home to the Temple, and the combined festival was explicitly connected to the Exodus (as in ).

In critical analysis
Some scholars who follow the Documentary Hypothesis attribute the parashah to two separate sources. These scholars often attribute the material beginning at  through the balance of the parashah to the original Deuteronomic Code (sometimes abbreviated Dtn). These scholars then posit that the first Deuteronomistic historian (sometimes abbreviated Dtr 1) added the material at the beginning of the parashah, in the edition of Deuteronomy that existed during Josiah's time.

Commandments
According to Sefer ha-Chinuch, there are 17 positive and 38 negative commandments in the parashah.
To destroy idols and their accessories
Not to destroy objects associated with God's Name
To bring all avowed and freewill offerings to the Temple on the first subsequent festival
Not to offer any sacrifices outside the Temple courtyard
To offer all sacrifices in the Temple
To redeem dedicated animals which have become disqualified
Not to eat the second tithe of grains outside Jerusalem
Not to eat the second tithe of wine products outside Jerusalem
Not to eat the second tithe of oil outside Jerusalem
The Kohanim must not eat unblemished firstborn animals outside Jerusalem
The Kohanim must not eat sacrificial meat outside the Temple courtyard
Not to eat the meat of the burnt offering
Not to eat the meat of minor sacrifices before sprinkling the blood on the altar
The Kohanim must not eat first fruits before they are set down in the Sanctuary grounds
Not to refrain from rejoicing with, and giving gifts to, the Levites
To ritually slaughter an animal before eating it
Not to eat a limb or part taken from a living animal
To bring all sacrifices from outside Israel to the Temple
Not to add to the Torah commandments or their oral explanations
Not to diminish from the Torah any commandments, in whole or in part
Not to listen to a false prophet
Not to love an enticer to idolatry
Not to cease hating the enticer to idolatry
Not to save the enticer to idolatry
Not to say anything in defense of the enticer to idolatry
Not to refrain from incriminating the enticer to idolatry
Not to entice an individual to idol worship
Carefully interrogate the witness
To burn a city that has turned to idol worship
Not to rebuild it as a city
Not to derive benefit from it
Not to tear the skin in mourning
Not to make a bald spot in mourning
Not to eat sacrifices which have become unfit or blemished
To examine the signs of fowl to distinguish between kosher and non-kosher
Not to eat non-kosher flying insects
Not to eat the meat of an animal that died without ritual slaughter
To set aside the second tithe (Ma'aser Sheni)
To separate the tithe for the poor
Not to pressure or claim from the borrower after the seventh year
To press the idolater for payment
To release all loans during the seventh year
Not to withhold charity from the poor
To give charity
Not to refrain from lending immediately before the release of the loans for fear of monetary loss
Not to send the Hebrew slave away empty-handed
Give the Hebrew slave gifts when he goes free
Not to work consecrated animals
Not to shear the fleece of consecrated animals
Not to eat chametz on the afternoon of the 14th day of Nisan
Not to leave the meat of the holiday offering of the 14th until the 16th
Not to offer a Passover offering on one's provisional altar
To rejoice on these three Festivals
To be seen at the Temple on Passover, Shavuot, and Sukkot
Not to appear at the Temple without offerings

In the liturgy
The parashah is reflected in these parts of the Jewish liturgy:

Reuven Hammer noted that Mishnah Tamid 5:1 recorded what was in effect the first siddur, as a part of which priests daily recited .

Haftarah
The haftarah is the third in the cycle of seven haftarot of consolation after Tisha B'Av, leading up to Rosh Hashanah.

In those years, the regular haftarah for Re'eh is pushed off two weeks later, to Parshat Ki Teitzei (which in those years falls on 14 Elul), as the haftarot for Re'eh and Ki Teitzei are positioned next to each other in Isaiah.

Notes

Further reading
The parashah has parallels or is discussed in these sources:

Biblical
 (tithe);  (tithe).
 (Passover);  (tithes);  (Passover, Shavuot);  (Sukkot).
; ; ; ;  (I set before you blessing and curse);  (Sukkot).
 (Sukkot).
 (tithes).
 (Sukkot);  (northern feast like Sukkot);  (ceremonial cutting).
 (debt servitude);  (centralization of sacrifices).
 (liberty to captives).
; ;  (ceremonial cutting);  (ceremonial cutting).
 (idols on hill, on mountains, under every leafy tree);  (Sukkot).
 (idols on mountains, on hill, under tree).
;  (tithes).
 (Sukkot).
 (tithes).
 (Sukkot).
 (Sukkot);  (Sukkot);  (three Pilgrim festivals);  (tithes);  (centralization of sacrifices).

Early nonrabbinic
1 Maccabees 3:49; 10:31; 11:35. Land of Israel, circa 100 BCE (tithes).
Josephus, Antiquities of the Jews 4:8:2–5, 7–8, 13, 28, 44–45 . Circa 93–94. Against Apion 2:24(193). Circa 97. In, e.g., The Works of Josephus: Complete and Unabridged, New Updated Edition. Translated by William Whiston, pages 114–17, 121, 123–24, 806. Peabody, Massachusetts: Hendrickson Publishers, 1987. 
Hebrews  (tithes).
Matthew  (tithes).
Luke  (tithes).
John  (Sukkot).

Classical rabbinic
Mishnah: Berakhot 1:5; Peah 8:5–9; Sheviit 1:1–10:9; Terumot 3:7; Maasrot 1:1–5:8; Maaser Sheni 1:1–5:15; Challah 1:3; Bikkurim 1:1–3:12; Shabbat 9:6; Pesachim 1:1–10:9; Sukkah 1:1–5:8; Beitzah 1:1–5:7; Megillah 1:3, 3:5; Chagigah 1:1–8; Ketubot 5:6; Sotah 7:5, 8; Kiddushin 1:2–3; Sanhedrin 1:3, 5, 10:4–6; Makkot 3:5, 15; Avodah Zarah 3:3–4; Avot 3:14; Zevachim 9:5, 14:2, 6; Menachot 7:6–8:1; Chullin 1:1–12:5; Bekhorot 4:1; Arakhin 8:7. Land of Israel, circa 200 CE. In, e.g., The Mishnah: A New Translation. Translated by Jacob Neusner. New Haven: Yale University Press, 1988. 
Tosefta: Berakhot 1:10; Peah 1:1, 4:2–10, 17, 20; Kilayim 1:9; Sheviit 1:1–8:11; Maasrot 1:1–3:16; Maaser Sheni 1:1–5:30; Bikkurim 1:1–2:16; Pisha 1:1–10:13; Sukkah 1:1–4:28; Yom Tov (Beitzah) 1:1–4:11; Megillah 3:5; Chagigah 1:1, 4–8; Ketubot 6:8; Sotah 7:17, 8:7, 10:2, 14:7; Bava Kamma 9:30; Sanhedrin 3:5–6, 7:2, 14:1–6; Makkot 5:8–9; Shevuot 3:8; Avodah Zarah 3:19, 6:10; Horayot 2:9; Zevachim 4:2, 13:16, 20; Shechitat Chullin 1:1–10:16; Menachot 9:2; Bekhorot 1:9, 7:1; Arakhin 4:26. Land of Israel, circa 250 CE. In, e.g., The Tosefta: Translated from the Hebrew, with a New Introduction. Translated by Jacob Neusner. Peabody, Massachusetts: Hendrickson Publishers, 2002. 
Sifre to Deuteronomy 53:1–143:5. Land of Israel, circa 250–350 CE. In, e.g., Sifre to Deuteronomy: An Analytical Translation. Translated by Jacob Neusner, volume 1, pages 175–342. Atlanta: Scholars Press, 1987. 
Jerusalem Talmud: Berakhot 12a, 16b, 27a, 32b; Peah 15b, 42b, 72a; Demai 7a, 9a, 28a, 65b; Kilayim 30a; Sheviit 1a–87b; Terumot 11b, 73a, 83b; Maasrot 1a–46a; Maaser Sheni 1a–59b; Challah 9b, 10b, 11a; Orlah 8a, 35a; Bikkurim 1a–26b; Shabbat 13a, 54a, 57a–b, 69b, 74b; Eruvin 20a; Pesachim 1a–86a; Yoma 50b, 52b–53a; Sukkah 1a–33b; Beitzah 1a–49b; Rosh Hashanah 3b–4a, 7a–b, 10a; Taanit 22b; Megillah 19a–20b, 31b; Chagigah 2b, 4a, 5a–6a; Yevamot 42b; Nedarim 16b, 25b; Nazir 2b, 7b, 26b, 27b; Sotah 2a, 9b, 32b, 37a, 46b; Kiddushin 5b, 10a–b, 11b, 22a–b; Bava Kamma 32b; Sanhedrin 1a, 25b, 29b, 31b, 36a, 37b, 41b, 46a, 48a, 60b, 69a–70b, 72a, 74a; Makkot 2b, 11a; Shevuot 6b, 16b; Avodah Zarah 14b, 19a–b, 20b–21a, 25b–26a, 29b, 33b; Horayot 4a, 17b. Tiberias, Land of Israel, circa 400 CE. In, e.g., Talmud Yerushalmi. Edited by Chaim Malinowitz, Yisroel Simcha Schorr, and Mordechai Marcus, volumes 1–14, 16, 18–19, 21–27, 30, 33–37, 40–41, 44–49. Brooklyn: Mesorah Publications, 2005–2020. And in, e.g., The Jerusalem Talmud: A Translation and Commentary. Edited by Jacob Neusner and translated by Jacob Neusner, Tzvee Zahavy, B. Barry Levy, and Edward Goldman. Peabody, Massachusetts: Hendrickson Publishers, 2009. 
Genesis Rabbah 14:9; 17:2; 53:6; 56:10; 65:1. Land of Israel, 5th century. In, e.g., Midrash Rabbah: Genesis. Translated by Harry Freedman and Maurice Simon, volume 1, pages 116, 132, 466, 500–01; volume 2, pages 581, 640, 983. London: Soncino Press, 1939. 

Babylonian Talmud: Berakhot 9a, 12b, 21a, 31b, 34b, 39b, 45a, 47b; Shabbat 22b, 31a, 54a, 63a, 90a, 94b, 108a, 119a, 120b, 128a, 130a, 148b, 151b; Eruvin 27a–28a, 31b, 37a, 80b, 96a, 100a; Pesachim 2a–121b; Yoma 2b, 34b, 36b, 56a, 70b, 75b–76a; Sukkah 2a–56b; Beitzah 2a–40b; Rosh Hashanah 4b–7a, 8a, 12b–13a, 14a, 21a, 28a; Taanit 9a, 21a; Megillah 5a, 9b–10a, 16b, 30b–31a; Moed Katan 2b–3a, 7b–8b, 12a, 13a, 14b, 15b, 18b–19a, 20a, 24b; Chagigah 2a–b, 3b, 4b, 5b–6b, 7b–9a, 10b, 16b–18a; Yevamot 9a, 13b, 62b, 73a–b, 74b, 79a, 83b, 86a, 93a, 104a; Ketubot 43a, 55a, 58b, 60a, 67b–68a, 89a; Nedarim 13a, 19a, 31a, 36b, 59b; Nazir 4b, 25a, 35b, 49b–50a; Sotah 14a, 23b, 32a–b, 33b, 38a, 39b, 41a, 47b–48a; Gittin 18a, 25a, 30a, 31a, 36a, 37a–b, 38b, 47a, 65a; Kiddushin 11b, 14b–15a, 16b–17b, 20a, 21b–22b, 26a, 29b, 34a–b, 35b–36a, 37a, 38b, 56b–57b, 80b; Bava Kamma 7a, 10a, 41a, 54a–b, 63a, 69b, 78a, 82b, 87b, 91b, 98a, 106b, 110b, 115b; Bava Metzia 6b, 27b, 30b, 31b, 33a, 42a, 44b–45a, 47b, 48b, 53b–54a, 56a, 88b, 90a; Bava Batra 8a, 10a, 63a, 80b, 91a, 145b; Sanhedrin 2a, 4a–b, 11b, 13b, 15b, 20b, 21b, 29a, 30b, 32a, 33b, 34b, 36b, 40a–41a, 43a, 45b, 47a–b, 50a, 52b, 54b, 55a, 56a, 59a, 60b, 61a–b, 63a–b, 64b, 70a, 71a, 78a, 84a, 85b, 87a, 89b–90a, 109a, 111b–13b; Makkot 3a–b, 5a, 8b, 11a, 12a, 13a, 14b, 16b–20a, 21a–22a, 23b; Shevuot 4b, 16a, 22b–23a, 25a, 34a, 44b, 49a; Avodah Zarah 9b, 12a–b, 13b, 20a, 34b, 36b, 42a, 43b, 44b, 45b, 51a–52a, 53b, 66a, 67b; Horayot 4b, 8a, 13a; Zevachim 7b, 9a, 12a, 29b, 34a, 36b, 45a, 49a, 50a, 52b, 55a, 60b, 62b, 76a, 85b, 97a, 104a, 106a, 107a–b, 112b, 114a–b, 117b–18a, 119a; Menachot 23a, 33b, 37b, 40b, 44b–45a, 65b–66a, 67a, 70b–71a, 77b, 78b, 81b–82a, 83a–b, 90b, 93a, 99b, 101b; Chullin 2a–142a; Bekhorot 4b, 6b–7a, 9b–10a, 11b–12a, 14b–15b, 19a, 21b, 23b, 25a, 26b, 27b–28a, 30a, 32a, 33a, 37a–b, 39a, 41a–b, 43a, 50b–51a, 53a–b, 54b, 56b; Arachin 7b, 28b–29a, 30b, 31b, 33a; Temurah 8a, 11b–12a, 17b, 18b, 21a–b, 28b, 31a; Keritot 3b, 4b, 21a, 24a, 27a; Meilah 13b, 15b–16a; Niddah 9a, 13a, 24a, 25a, 40a. Babylonia, 6th century. In, e.g., Talmud Bavli. Edited by Yisroel Simcha Schorr, Chaim Malinowitz, and Mordechai Marcus, 72 volumes. Brooklyn: Mesorah Pubs., 2006.

Medieval
Deuteronomy Rabbah 4:1–11. Land of Israel, 9th century. In, e.g., Midrash Rabbah: Leviticus. Translated by Harry Freedman and Maurice Simon. London: Soncino Press, 1939. 
Exodus Rabbah 30:5, 16. 10th century. In, e.g., Midrash Rabbah: Exodus. Translated by S. M. Lehrman. London: Soncino Press, 1939. 
Rashi. Commentary. Deuteronomy 11–16. Troyes, France, late 11th century. In, e.g., Rashi. The Torah: With Rashi's Commentary Translated, Annotated, and Elucidated. Translated and annotated by Yisrael Isser Zvi Herczeg, volume 5, pages 119–79. Brooklyn: Mesorah Publications, 1997. 

Letter from Nathan ha-Kohen ben Mevorakh to Eli ha-Kohen ben Yahya. Ascalon, Land of Israel, circa 1099. In Mark R. Cohen. The Voice of the Poor in the Middle Ages: An Anthology of Documents from the Cairo Geniza, pages 38–42. Princeton: Princeton University Press, 2005..
Rashbam. Commentary on the Torah. Troyes, early 12th century. In, e.g., Rashbam's Commentary on Deuteronomy: An Annotated Translation. Edited and translated by Martin I. Lockshin, pages 85–105. Providence, Rhode Island: Brown Judaic Studies, 2004. 
Judah Halevi. Kuzari. 3:40–41; 4:29. Toledo, Spain, 1130–1140. In, e.g., Jehuda Halevi. Kuzari: An Argument for the Faith of Israel. Introduction by Henry Slonimsky, pages 173, 241. New York: Schocken, 1964. 
Abraham ibn Ezra. Commentary on the Torah. Mid-12th century. In, e.g., Ibn Ezra's Commentary on the Pentateuch: Deuteronomy (Devarim). Translated and annotated by H. Norman Strickman and Arthur M. Silver, volume 5, pages 78–116. New York: Menorah Publishing Company, 2001. 
Maimonides. Mishneh Torah, Introduction: Preface; Hilchot Yesodei HaTorah (The Laws that Are the Foundations of the Torah), chapter 6, halachot 1, 7; chapter 8, halachah 3; chapter 9, halachot 1, 3, 5. Cairo, Egypt, 1170–1180. In, e.g., Mishneh Torah: Hilchot Yesodei HaTorah: The Laws [which Are] the Foundations of the Torah. Translated by Eliyahu Touger, volume 1, pages 12–15, 230–33, 238–41, 268–83. New York: Moznaim Publishing, 1989. 

Maimonides. Mishneh Torah: Hilchot De'ot (The Laws of Personal Development), chapter 1, halachot 4–6; chapter 5, halachah 10. Egypt, circa 1170–1180. In, e.g., Mishneh Torah: Hilchot De'ot: The Laws of Personality Development: and Hilchot Talmud Torah: The Laws of Torah Study. Translated by Za'ev Abramson and Eliyahu Touger, volume 2, pages 18–29, 106–09. New York: Moznaim Publishing, 1989.   (1991).
Maimonides. Mishneh Torah: Hilchot Avodat Kochavim V'Chukkoteihem (The Laws of the Worship of Stars and their Statutes), chapter 1, halachah 2; chapter 2, halachah 2; chapter 3, halachah 2; chapter 4; chapter 5; chapter 7, halachot 1–2, 4, 18; chapter 8, halachot 1, 3; chapter 10, halachah 4; chapter 11, halachah 1; chapter 12, halachah 3, 13, 15. Egypt, circa 1170–1180. In, e.g., Mishneh Torah: Hilchot Avodat Kochavim V'Chukkoteihem: The Laws of the Worship of Stars and their Statutes.Translated by Eliyahu Touger, volume 3, pages 16–21, 32–35, 52–55, 72–103, 112–17, 142–53, 190–93. New York: Moznaim Publishing, 1990.  .
Maimonides. Mishneh Torah: Hilchot Teshuvah (The Laws of Repentance), chapter 5; chapter 6, halachah 5. Egypt, circa 1170–1180. In, e.g., Mishneh Torah: Hilchot Teshuvah: The Laws of Repentance. Translated by Eliyahu Touger, volume 4, pages 114–35, 150–55. New York: Moznaim Publishing, 1990. 
Maimonides. The Guide for the Perplexed, 1:24, 36, 38, 41, 54; 2:32; 3:17, 24, 29, 32, 39, 41–42, 45–48. Cairo, Egypt, 1190. In, e.g., Moses Maimonides. The Guide for the Perplexed. Translated by Michael Friedländer, pages 34, 51, 54, 56, 77–78, 221, 288, 304–05, 317, 320, 323, 325, 339–40, 347, 351, 355, 357–358, 362, 366–67, 371. New York: Dover Publications, 1956. 

Hezekiah ben Manoah. Hizkuni. France, circa 1240. In, e.g., Chizkiyahu ben Manoach. Chizkuni: Torah Commentary. Translated and annotated by Eliyahu Munk, volume 4, pages 1095–124. Jerusalem: Ktav Publishers, 2013. 
Nachmanides. Commentary on the Torah. Jerusalem, circa 1270. In, e.g., Ramban (Nachmanides): Commentary on the Torah: Deuteronomy. Translated by Charles B. Chavel, volume 5, pages 139–91. New York: Shilo Publishing House, 1976. 

Zohar, part 1, pages 3a, 82b, 157a, 163b, 167b, 184a, 242a, 245b; part 2, pages 5b, 20a, 22a, 38a, 40a, 89b, 94b, 98a, 121a, 124a, 125a–b, 128a, 148a, 168a, 174b; part 3, pages 7b, 20b, 104a, 206a, 296b. Spain, late 13th century. In, e.g., The Zohar. Translated by Harry Sperling and Maurice Simon. 5 volumes. London: Soncino Press, 1934.
Bahya ben Asher. Commentary on the Torah. Spain, early 14th century. In, e.g., Midrash Rabbeinu Bachya: Torah Commentary by Rabbi Bachya ben Asher. Translated and annotated by Eliyahu Munk, volume 7, pages 2499–550. Jerusalem: Lambda Publishers, 2003. 
Letter from Joshua Maimonides to the Rabbanite congregations of Fustat. Cairo, early 14th century. In Mark R. Cohen. The Voice of the Poor in the Middle Ages: An Anthology of Documents from the Cairo Geniza, pages 193–95..
Isaac ben Moses Arama. Akedat Yizhak (The Binding of Isaac). Late 15th century. In, e.g., Yitzchak Arama. Akeydat Yitzchak: Commentary of Rabbi Yitzchak Arama on the Torah. Translated and condensed by Eliyahu Munk, volume 2, pages 835–49. New York, Lambda Publishers, 2001.

Modern
Isaac Abravanel. Commentary on the Torah. Italy, between 1492–1509. In, e.g., Abarbanel: Selected Commentaries on the Torah: Volume 5: Devarim/Deuteronomy. Translated and annotated by Israel Lazar, pages 64–79. Brooklyn: CreateSpace, 2015. 
Obadiah ben Jacob Sforno. Commentary on the Torah. Venice, 1567. In, e.g., Sforno: Commentary on the Torah. Translation and explanatory notes by Raphael Pelcovitz, pages 892–915. Brooklyn: Mesorah Publications, 1997. 
Moshe Alshich. Commentary on the Torah. Safed, circa 1593. In, e.g., Moshe Alshich. Midrash of Rabbi Moshe Alshich on the Torah. Translated and annotated by Eliyahu Munk, volume 3, pages 1017–43. New York, Lambda Publishers, 2000. 

Thomas Hobbes. Leviathan, 3:32, 36, 37; 4:44; Review & Conclusion. England, 1651. Reprint edited by C. B. Macpherson, pages 412, 461, 466–67, 476, 638, 724. Harmondsworth, England: Penguin Classics, 1982. 
Avraham Yehoshua Heschel. Commentaries on the Torah. Cracow, Poland, mid 17th century. Compiled as Chanukat HaTorah. Edited by Chanoch Henoch Erzohn. Piotrkow, Poland, 1900. In Avraham Yehoshua Heschel. Chanukas HaTorah: Mystical Insights of Rav Avraham Yehoshua Heschel on Chumash. Translated by Avraham Peretz Friedman, pages 304–05. Southfield, Michigan: Targum Press/Feldheim Publishers, 2004. 
Chaim ibn Attar. Ohr ha-Chaim. Venice, 1742. In Chayim ben Attar. Or Hachayim: Commentary on the Torah. Translated by Eliyahu Munk, volume 5, pages 1843–82. Brooklyn: Lambda Publishers, 1999. 

Word of Wisdom 1833. Codified as Doctrine and Covenants section 89. In, e.g., Stephen E. Robinson and H. Dean Garrett. A Commentary on the Doctrine and Covenants, Volume Three, section 89. Salt Lake City: Deseret Book, 2004. (Mormon dietary laws).
Samuel David Luzzatto (Shadal). Commentary on the Torah. Padua, 1871. In, e.g., Samuel David Luzzatto. Torah Commentary. Translated and annotated by Eliyahu Munk, volume 4, pages 1183–98. New York: Lambda Publishers, 2012. 
Union of American Hebrew Congregations. The Pittsburgh Platform. Pittsburgh, 1885. ("We hold that all such Mosaic and rabbinical laws as regulate diet . . . originated in ages and under the influence of ideas entirely foreign to our present mental and spiritual state. They fail to impress the modern Jew with a spirit of priestly holiness; their observance in our days is apt rather to obstruct than to further modern spiritual elevation.")

Yehudah Aryeh Leib Alter. Sefat Emet. Góra Kalwaria (Ger), Poland, before 1906. Excerpted in The Language of Truth: The Torah Commentary of Sefat Emet. Translated and interpreted by Arthur Green, pages 301–07. Philadelphia: Jewish Publication Society, 1998. Reprinted 2012. 

Hermann Cohen. Religion of Reason: Out of the Sources of Judaism. Translated with an introduction by Simon Kaplan; introductory essays by Leo Strauss, pages 127–28, 151, 153, 348, 457. New York: Ungar, 1972. Reprinted Atlanta: Scholars Press, 1995. Originally published as Religion der Vernunft aus den Quellen des Judentums. Leipzig: Gustav Fock, 1919.
H. G. Wells. “Serfs, Slaves, Social Classes and Free Individuals.” In The Outline of History: Being a Plain History of Life and Mankind, pages 254–59. New York: The Macmillan Company, 1920. Revised edition Doubleday and Company, 1971. 
Alexander Alan Steinbach. Sabbath Queen: Fifty-four Bible Talks to the Young Based on Each Portion of the Pentateuch, pages 148–51. New York: Behrman's Jewish Book House, 1936.
Joseph Reider. The Holy Scriptures: Deuteronomy with Commentary, pages 115–65. Philadelphia: Jewish Publication Society, 1937.

Thomas Mann. Joseph and His Brothers. Translated by John E. Woods, page 109. New York: Alfred A. Knopf, 2005. Originally published as Joseph und seine Brüder. Stockholm: Bermann-Fischer Verlag, 1943.
Isaac Mendelsohn. "Slavery in the Ancient Near East." Biblical Archaeologist, volume 9 (1946): pages 74–88.
Isaac Mendelsohn. Slavery in the Ancient Near East. New York: Oxford University Press, 1949.
Ernest Wiesenberg. "Related Prohibitions: Swine Breeding and the Study of Greek." Hebrew Union College Annual. Volume 27 (1956): pages 213–33.
Morris Adler. The World of the Talmud, page 30. B'nai B'rith Hillel Foundations, 1958. Reprinted Kessinger Publishing, 2007. 
Herbert C. Brichto. The Problem of "Curse" in the Hebrew Bible. Philadelphia: Society of Biblical Literature and Exegesis, 1963.
Ernest Nicholson. "The Centralisation of the Cult in Deuteronomy." Vetus Testamentum, volume 13 (number 4) (October 1963), pages 380–89.
Moshe Weinfeld. "Cult Centralization in Israel in the Light of a Neo-Babylonian Analogy." Journal of Near Eastern Studies, volume 23 (number 3) (July 1964): pages 202–12.
Gerhard von Rad. Deuteronomy: A Commentary. Translated by Dorothea M. Barton, pages 81–115. Philadelphia: The Westminster Press, 1966. ASIN B01FIWK66C. Originally published as Das fünfte Buch Mose: Deuteronomium. Göttingen: Vandenhoeck & Ruprecht, 1964.

Martin Buber. On the Bible: Eighteen studies, pages 80–92. New York: Schocken Books, 1968.
Joe Green. The Jewish Vegetarian Tradition. South Africa: 1969.
Otto Eissfeldt. "Gilgal or Shechem." In Proclamation and Presence: Old Testament Essays in Honour of Gwynne Henton Davies. Edited by John I. Durham and J. Roy Porter, pages 90–101. London: SCM Press, 1970. 
Seymour E. Freedman. The Book of Kashruth: A Treasury of Kosher Facts and Frauds. Bloch Publishing Company, 1970. LCCN 74-113870.
W. Eugene Claburn. "The Fiscal Basis of Josiah's Reforms." Journal of Biblical Literature, volume 92 (number 1) (March 1973): pages 11–22.
Noah J. Cohen. Tsa'ar Ba'ale Hayim—The Prevention of Cruelty to Animals, Its Bases, Development, and Legislation in Hebrew Literature. New York: Feldheim, 1976.
Jacob Milgrom. "Profane Slaughter and a Formulaic Key to the Composition of Deuteronomy." Hebrew Union College Annual, volume 47 (1976): pages 1–17.
Samuel H. Dresner, Seymour Siegel, and David M. Pollock. The Jewish Dietary Laws. United Synagogue, New York, 1980. 
Nehama Leibowitz. Studies in Devarim: Deuteronomy, pages 120–59. Jerusalem: The World Zionist Organization, 1980.
Alfred Cohen. "Vegetarianism from a Jewish Perspective." Journal of Halacha and Contemporary Society, volume 1 (number 2) (fall 1981).
Louis A. Berman. Vegetarianism and the Jewish Tradition. New York: Ktav, 1982. 
Elijah J. Schochet. Animal Life in Jewish Tradition: Attitudes and Relationships. New York: Ktav, 1984.
Jacob Milgrom. "‘You Shall Not Boil a Kid in Its Mother's Milk': An archaeological myth destroyed." Bible Review, volume 1 (number 3) (Fall 1985): pages 48–55.
J. David Bleich. "Vegetarianism and Judaism." Tradition, volume 23 (number 1) (Summer, 1987).
Pinchas H. Peli. Torah Today: A Renewed Encounter with Scripture, pages 213–16. Washington, D.C.: B'nai B'rith Books, 1987. 
Philip Goodman. "The Sukkot/Simhat Torah Anthology." Philadelphia: Jewish Publication Society, 1988. 
Jacob Milgrom. "Ethics and Ritual: The Foundations of the Biblical Dietary Laws." In Religion and Law: Biblical, Jewish, and Islamic Perspectives, pages 159–91. Edited by E.B. Firmage. Winona Lake, Indiana: Eisenbrauns, 1989. 
Patrick D. Miller. Deuteronomy, pages 128–40. Louisville: John Knox Press, 1990.
Mark S. Smith. The Early History of God: Yahweh and the Other Deities in Ancient Israel, pages 2, 80, 100, 125, 129, 133, 151–52. New York: HarperSanFrancisco, 1990. 
Philip Goodman. "Passover Anthology." Philadelphia: Jewish Publication Society, 1992. 
Philip Goodman. "Shavuot Anthology." Philadelphia: Jewish Publication Society, 1992. 
Roberta Kalechofsky. Judaism and Animal Rights: Classical and Contemporary Responses. Marblehead, Massachusetts: Micah Publications, 1992. 
Jacob Milgrom. "Food and Faith: The Ethical Foundations of the Biblical Diet Laws: The Bible has worked out a system of restrictions whereby humans may satiate their lust for animal flesh and not be dehumanized. These laws teach reverence for life." Bible Review, volume 8 (number 6) (December 1992).
Kassel Abelson. "Official Use of ‘God.'" New York: Rabbinical Assembly, 1993. YD 278:12.1993. In Responsa: 1991–2000: The Committee on Jewish Law and Standards of the Conservative Movement. Edited by Kassel Abelson and David J. Fine, pages 151–52. New York: Rabbinical Assembly, 2002. 
A Song of Power and the Power of Song: Essays on the Book of Deuteronomy. Edited by Duane L. Christensen. Winona Lake, Indiana: Eisenbrauns, 1993. 
Aaron Wildavsky. Assimilation versus Separation: Joseph the Administrator and the Politics of Religion in Biblical Israel, pages 3–4. New Brunswick, New Jersey: Transaction Publishers, 1993. 
Judith S. Antonelli. "The Snare of Idolatry." In In the Image of God: A Feminist Commentary on the Torah, pages 428–38. Northvale, New Jersey: Jason Aronson, 1995. 
Walter Houston. “‘You Shall Open Your Hand to Your Needy Brother’: Ideology and Moral Formation in Deut. 15.1–18.” In John W. Rogerson, Margaret Davies, and M. Daniel Carroll, editors, The Bible in Ethics: The Second Sheffield Colloquium, pages 296–314. Sheffield: Sheffield Academic Press, 1995.
Roberta Kalechofsky. A Boy, A Chicken, and The Lion of Judea—How Ari Became a Vegetarian. Marblehead, Massachusetts: Micah Publications, 1995. 
Rabbis and Vegetarianism: An Evolving Tradition. Edited by Roberta Kalechofsky. Marblehead, Massachusetts: Micah Publications, 1995. 
Ellen Frankel. The Five Books of Miriam: A Woman's Commentary on the Torah, pages 261–66. New York: G. P. Putnam's Sons, 1996. 
Jack R. Lundbom. "The Inclusio and Other Framing Devices in Deuteronomy I–XXVIII." Vetus Testamentum, volume 46 (number 3) (July 1996): pages 296–315.

W. Gunther Plaut. The Haftarah Commentary, pages 463–70. New York: UAHC Press, 1996. 
Jeffrey H. Tigay. The JPS Torah Commentary: Deuteronomy: The Traditional Hebrew Text with the New JPS Translation, pages 116–59, 446–83. Philadelphia: Jewish Publication Society, 1996. 
Sorel Goldberg Loeb and Barbara Binder Kadden. Teaching Torah: A Treasury of Insights and Activities, pages 310–15. Denver: A.R.E. Publishing, 1997. 
Robert Goodman. Teaching Jewish Holidays: History, Values, and Activities. Denver: A.R.E. Publishing, 1997. 
Jacob Milgrom. "Jubilee: A Rallying Cry for Today's Oppressed: The laws of the Jubilee year offer a blueprint for bridging the gap between the have and have-not nations." Bible Review, volume 13 (number 2) (April 1997).
Elliot N. Dorff and Aaron L. Mackler. "Responsibilities for the Provision of Health Care." New York: Rabbinical Assembly, 1998. YD 336:1.1998. In Responsa: 1991–2000: The Committee on Jewish Law and Standards of the Conservative Movement. Edited by Kassel Abelson and David J. Fine, pages 319, 321, 324. New York: Rabbinical Assembly, 2002. (the implications for our duty to provide medical care of following God and of our duty to aid the poor).
Roberta Kalechofsky. Vegetarian Judaism: A Guide for Everyone. Marblehead, Massachusetts: Micah Publications, 1998. 

Adin Steinsaltz. Simple Words: Thinking About What Really Matters in Life, page 166. New York: Simon & Schuster, 1999. 
Richard D. Nelson. "Deuteronomy." In The HarperCollins Bible Commentary. Edited by James L. Mays, pages 200–03. New York: HarperCollins Publishers, revised edition, 2000. 
Laura M. Rappaport. "A Time to Tear Down, a Time to Build Up." In The Women's Torah Commentary: New Insights from Women Rabbis on the 54 Weekly Torah Portions. Edited by Elyse Goldstein, pages 351–57. Woodstock, Vermont: Jewish Lights Publishing, 2000. 
Walter Brueggemann. Abingdon Old Testament Commentaries: Deuteronomy, pages 141–78. Nashville: Abingdon Press, 2001. 
Lainie Blum Cogan and Judy Weiss. Teaching Haftarah: Background, Insights, and Strategies, pages 327–29. Denver: A.R.E. Publishing, 2002. 
Richard H. Schwartz. Judaism and Vegetarianism. New York: Lantern, 2001. 
Michael Fishbane. The JPS Bible Commentary: Haftarot, pages 291–94. Philadelphia: Jewish Publication Society, 2002. 
Pinchus Presworsky. Birds of the Torah. Brooklyn: Silver Graphics, 2002. 
John J. Collins. "The Zeal of Phinehas: The Bible and the Legitimation of Violence." Journal of Biblical Literature, volume 122 (number 1) (Spring 2003): pages 3–21. (condemnation of unsanctioned worship in ).
Alan Lew. This Is Real and You Are Completely Unprepared: The Days of Awe as a Journey of Transformation, pages 65–76. Boston: Little, Brown and Co., 2003. 
Jack M. Sasson. "Should Cheeseburgers Be Kosher? A Different Interpretation of Five Hebrew Words." Bible Review, volume 19 (number 6) (December 2003): pages 40–43, 50–51.
Robert Alter. The Five Books of Moses: A Translation with Commentary, pages 938–61. New York: W.W. Norton & Co., 2004. 
Aaron Gross, Richard H. Schwartz, Roberta Kalechofsky, and Jay Levine. A Case For Jewish Vegetarianism. Norfolk, Virginia: People for the Ethical Treatment of Animals, 2004.
Joanne Yocheved Heiligman. "Haftarat Re’eh: Isaiah 54:11–55:5." In The Women's Haftarah Commentary: New Insights from Women Rabbis on the 54 Weekly Haftarah Portions, the 5 Megillot & Special Shabbatot. Edited by Elyse Goldstein, pages 227–29. Woodstock, Vermont: Jewish Lights Publishing, 2004. 
Bernard M. Levinson. "Deuteronomy." In The Jewish Study Bible. Edited by Adele Berlin and Marc Zvi Brettler, pages 390–403. New York: Oxford University Press, 2004. 
Professors on the Parashah: Studies on the Weekly Torah Reading Edited by Leib Moscovitz, pages 314–22. Jerusalem: Urim Publications, 2005. 
Israel Finkelstein and Neil Asher Silberman. “Temple and Dynasty: Hezekiah, the Remaking of Judah and the Rise of the Pan-Israelite Ideology.” Journal for the Study of the Old Testament, volume 30 (number 3) (March 2006): pages 259–85.
Nathaniel Philbrick. Mayflower: A Story of Courage, Community, and War, page 309. New York: Viking Penguin, 2006. (Jubilee).
W. Gunther Plaut. The Torah: A Modern Commentary: Revised Edition. Revised edition edited by David E.S. Stern, pages 1255–91. New York: Union for Reform Judaism, 2006. 
Suzanne A. Brody. "Blessing or Curse." In Dancing in the White Spaces: The Yearly Torah Cycle and More Poems, page 105. Shelbyville, Kentucky: Wasteland Press, 2007. 
Shai Cherry. "The Hebrew Slave." In Torah Through Time: Understanding Bible Commentary, from the Rabbinic Period to Modern Times, pages 101–31. Philadelphia: The Jewish Publication Society, 2007. 
David C. Kraemer. Jewish Eating and Identity Through the Ages. New York: Routledge, 2007. 
James L. Kugel. How To Read the Bible: A Guide to Scripture, Then and Now, pages 30, 131, 247, 299, 306–13, 325, 345, 348, 354, 404, 423, 579, 610, 669. New York: Free Press, 2007. 
Naphtali S. Meshel. "Food for Thought: Systems of Categorization in Leviticus 11." Harvard Theological Review, volume 101 (number 2) (April 2008): pages 203, 207, 209–13.
Gloria London. "Why Milk and Meat Don't Mix: A New Explanation for a Puzzling Kosher Law." Biblical Archaeology Review, volume 34 (number 6) (November/December 2008): pages 66–69.
Nathan MacDonald. What Did the Ancient Israelites Eat? Diet in Biblical Times. Cambridge: William B. Eerdmans Publishing Company, 2008. 
Yosef Zvi Rimon. Shemita: From the Sources to Practical Halacha. The Toby Press, 2008. 
The Torah: A Women's Commentary. Edited by Tamara Cohn Eskenazi and Andrea L. Weiss, pages 1115–40. New York: URJ Press, 2008. 
Eugene E. Carpenter. "Deuteronomy." In Zondervan Illustrated Bible Backgrounds Commentary. Edited by John H. Walton, volume 1, pages 469–80. Grand Rapids, Michigan: Zondervan, 2009. 
Gregg Drinkwater. "Neither Adding nor Taking Away: Parashat Re'eh (Deuteronomy 11:26–16:17)." In Torah Queeries: Weekly Commentaries on the Hebrew Bible. Edited by Gregg Drinkwater, Joshua Lesser, and David Shneer; foreword by Judith Plaskow, pages 246–49. New York: New York University Press, 2009. 
Reuven Hammer. Entering Torah: Prefaces to the Weekly Torah Portion, pages 269–74. New York: Gefen Publishing House, 2009. 
Union for Reform Judaism. “Eating Jewishly.” New York, 2009. (resolution adopted by the URJ).
Eric Nelson. "‘For the Land Is Mine’: The Hebrew Commonwealth and the Rise of Redistribution." In The Hebrew Republic: Jewish Sources and the Transformation of European Political Thought, pages 57–87. Cambridge, Massachusetts: Harvard University Press, 2010. 
Stefan Schorch. “‘A Young Goat in Its Mother's Milk’? Understanding an Ancient Prohibition.” Vetus Testamentum, volume 60 (number 1) (2010): pages 116–30.
Joseph Telushkin. Hillel: If Not Now, When? pages 47–52. New York: Nextbook, Schocken, 2010. (prozbol).
Joshua Berman. "CTH 133 and the Hittite Provenance of Deuteronomy 13." Journal of Biblical Literature, volume 130 (number 1) (spring 2011): pages 25–44.
David Graeber. Debt: The First 5000 Years. Brooklyn: Melville House, 2011. (remission of debts).
Pinchus Presworsky. Animals of the Torah. Sys Marketing Inc., 2011. 
William G. Dever. The Lives of Ordinary People in Ancient Israel: When Archaeology and the Bible Intersect, pages 192, 290. Grand Rapids, Michigan: William B. Eerdmans Publishing Company, 2012. 

Jonathan Haidt. The Righteous Mind: Why Good People Are Divided by Politics and Religion, pages 13, 103, 325 note 22, 337 note 16. New York: Pantheon, 2012. (kashrut).
Shmuel Herzfeld. "I Am for My Beloved." In Fifty-Four Pick Up: Fifteen-Minute Inspirational Torah Lessons, pages 268–72. Jerusalem: Gefen Publishing House, 2012. 
Nicholas Kristof. "When Emily Was Sold for Sex." The New York Times. (February 13, 2014): page A27. (human trafficking in our time).
Walk Free Foundation. The Global Slavery Index 2014. Australia, 2014.

Pablo Diego-Rosell and Jacqueline Joudo Larsen. "35.8 Million Adults and Children in Slavery Worldwide." Gallup. (November 17, 2014).
Shlomo Riskin. Torah Lights: Devarim: Moses Bequeaths Legacy, History, and Covenant, pages 107–58. New Milford, Connecticut: Maggid Books, 2014. 
The Commentators' Bible: The Rubin JPS Miqra'ot Gedolot: Deuteronomy. Edited, translated, and annotated by Michael Carasik, pages 82–112. Philadelphia: Jewish Publication Society, 2015. 

Jonathan Sacks. Lessons in Leadership: A Weekly Reading of the Jewish Bible, pages 257–61. New Milford, Connecticut: Maggid Books, 2015. 
Jonathan Sacks. Essays on Ethics: A Weekly Reading of the Jewish Bible, pages 293–98. New Milford, Connecticut: Maggid Books, 2016. 
Shai Held. The Heart of Torah, Volume 2: Essays on the Weekly Torah Portion: Leviticus, Numbers, and Deuteronomy, pages 230–39. Philadelphia: Jewish Publication Society, 2017. 
Steven Levy and Sarah Levy. The JPS Rashi Discussion Torah Commentary, pages 160–62. Philadelphia: Jewish Publication Society, 2017. 
Sandra Lynn Richter. “The Question of Provenance and the Economics of Deuteronomy.” Journal for the Study of the Old Testament, volume 42 (number 1) (September 2017): pages 23–50.
Laura Reiley. “Doctrine and Diet: Shalt Thou Eat an Impossible Burger?” Washington Post. September 12, 2019, pages A1, A18.
Jonathan Sacks. Covenant & Conversation: A Weekly Reading of the Jewish Bible: Deuteronomy: Renewal of the Sinai Covenant, pages 117–48. New Milford, Connecticut: Maggid Books, 2019.
U.S. Department of State. Trafficking in Persons Report: June 2019. (slavery in the present day).
Ralph Allan Smith. “The Third Commandment in Deuteronomy 14:1–21.”

External links

Texts
Masoretic text and 1917 JPS translation
Hear the parashah chanted
Hear the parashah read in Hebrew

Commentaries

Academy for Jewish Religion, New York
Aish.com
Akhlah: The Jewish Children's Learning Network
Aleph Beta Academy
American Jewish University - Ziegler School of Rabbinic Studies
Anshe Emes Synagogue, Los Angeles
Ari Goldwag
Bar-Ilan University
Chabad.org
eparsha.com
G-dcast
The Israel Koschitzky Virtual Beit Midrash
Jewish Agency for Israel
Jewish Theological Seminary
Mechon Hadar
MyJewishLearning.com
Ohr Sameach
Orthodox Union
OzTorah, Torah from Australia
Oz Ve Shalom—Netivot Shalom
Pardes from Jerusalem
Professor James L. Kugel
Professor Michael Carasik
Rabbi Fabian Werbin
RabbiShimon.com
Rabbi Shlomo Riskin
Rabbi Shmuel Herzfeld
Rabbi Stan Levin
Reconstructionist Judaism 
Sephardic Institute
Shiur.com
613.org Jewish Torah Audio
Tanach Study Center
Teach613.org, Torah Education at Cherry Hill
TheTorah.com
Torah from Dixie
Torah.org
TorahVort.com
Union for Reform Judaism
United Hebrew Congregations of the Commonwealth
United Synagogue of Conservative Judaism
What's Bothering Rashi?
Yeshivat Chovevei Torah
Yeshiva University

Weekly Torah readings in Av
Weekly Torah readings from Deuteronomy